= 2019 Arizona Lottery 100 =

Race details
- Race 14 of 14 in the 2019 NASCAR K&N Pro Series West season
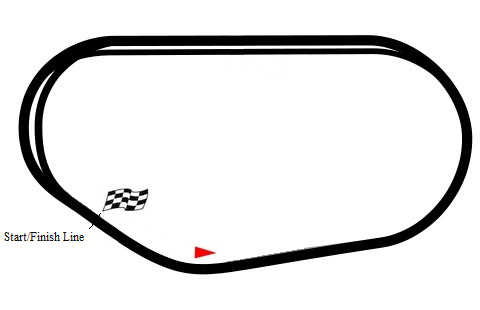
- Date: November 9, 2019
- Location: Phoenix Raceway in Avondale, Arizona
- Course: Permanent racing facility
- Course length: 1.00 miles (1.61 km)
- Distance: 100 laps, 100.00 mi (160.93 km)
- Average speed: 80.731 miles per hour (129.924 km/h)

Pole position
Driver	Sam Mayer	GMS Racing
- Time: 27.444

Most laps led
Driver	Sam Mayer	GMS Racing
- Laps: 63

Winner
No. 40	Ty Gibbs	Levin Racing with Joe Gibbs Racing

The 2019 Arizona Lottery 100 was the fourteenth and final stock car race of the 2019 NASCAR K&N Pro Series West season. The race was held on Saturday, November 9, 2019, in Avondale, Arizona, at Phoenix Raceway, a 1 mile (1.6 km) paved racetrack. The race 108 laps to complete due to a Green–white–checker finish. At race's end, Ty Gibbs took the victory in his first career NASCAR K&N Pro Series West start. To fill out the podium, Sam Mayer of GMS Racing and Derek Kraus of Bill McAnally Racing would finish second and third, respectively.

== Background ==
=== Entry list ===
#	Driver	Team	Make
0	Bobby Hillis Jr.	Hillis Racing	Toyota
2	Ty Majeski	Chad Bryant Racing	Ford
6	Jagger Jones	Sunrise Ford Racing	Ford
7	Taylor Canfield	Jefferson Pitts Racing	Ford
08	Travis Milburn	Kart Idaho Racing	Chevrolet
8	Billy Kann	B&B Motorsports	Chevrolet
9	Trevor Huddleston	Sunrise Ford Racing	Ford
10	Riley Herbst	Levin Racing with Joe Gibbs Racing	Toyota
13	Todd Souza	Central Coast Racing	Toyota
15	Drew Dollar	David Gilliland Racing	Toyota
16	Derek Kraus	Bill McAnally Racing	Toyota
17	Zane Smith	Steve McGowan Motorsports	Chevrolet
18	Bill Kann	B&B Motorsports	Chevrolet
19	Hailie Deegan	Bill McAnally Racing	Toyota
21	Sam Mayer	GMS Racing	Chevrolet
22	Corey Heim	Chad Bryant Racing	Ford
27	Matt Levin	JP Racing	Ford
34	Josh Jackson	Stafford Smith	Toyota
36	Bobby Hillis Jr.	Hillis Racing	Toyota
37	Keith McGee	Kart Idaho Racing	Ford
38	Tony Cosentino	Kevin McCarty	Ford
40	Ty Gibbs	Levin Racing with Joe Gibbs Racing	Toyota
55	Trenton Moriarity	Jefferson Pitts Racing	Ford
77	Takuma Koga	Performance P-1 Motorsports	Toyota
78	Jack Wood	Velocity Racing	Toyota
99	Brittney Zamora	Bill McAnally Racing	Toyota
Official entry list

== Practice ==
Pos.	#	Driver	Team	Make	Time	Speed
1	21	Sam Mayer	GMS Racing	Chevrolet	27.345	131.651
2	10	Riley Herbst	Levin Racing with Joe Gibbs Racing	Toyota	27.499	130.914
3	40	Ty Gibbs	Levin Racing with Joe Gibbs Racing	Toyota	27.549	130.676
Full practice results

== Qualifying ==
=== Full qualifying results ===
Pos.	#	Driver	Team	Make	Time	Speed
1	21	Sam Mayer	GMS Racing	Chevrolet	27.444	131.176
2	17	Zane Smith	Steve McGowan Motorsports	Chevrolet	27.943	128.834
3	2	Ty Majeski	Chad Bryant Racing	Chevrolet	27.981	128.659
4	9	Trevor Huddleston	Sunrise Ford Racing	Ford	28.076	128.223
5	15	Drew Dollar	DGR-Crosley	Toyota	28.154	127.868
6	6	Jagger Jones	Sunrise Ford Racing	Ford	28.329	127.078
7	99	Brittney Zamora	Bill McAnally Racing	Toyota	28.442	126.573
8	78	Jack Wood	Velocity Racing	Toyota	29.091	123.750
9	27	Matt Levin	JP Racing	Ford	29.238	123.127
10	08	Travis Milburn	Kart Idaho Racing	Chevrolet	29.258	123.043
11	77	Takuma Koga	Performance P-1 Motorsports	Toyota	29.600	121.622
12	37	Keith McGee	Kart Idaho Racing	Ford	29.600	121.622
13	27	Billy Kann	B&B Motorsports	Chevrolet	30.778	116.967
14	34	Josh Jackson	Stafford Smith	Toyota	30.826	116.785
15	36	Bobby Hillis Jr.	Hillis Racing	Toyota	31.382	114.715
16	10	Riley Herbst	Levin Racing with Joe Gibbs Racing	Toyota		
17	40	Ty Gibbs	Levin Racing with Joe Gibbs Racing	Toyota		
18	16	Derek Kraus	Bill McAnally Racing	Toyota		
19	22	Corey Heim	Chad Bryant Racing	Ford		
20	19	Hailie Deegan	Bill McAnally Racing	Toyota		
21	55	Trenton Moriarity	Jefferson Pitts Racing	Ford		
22	13	Todd Souza	Central Coast Racing	Toyota		
23	7	Taylor Canfield	Jefferson Pitts Racing	Ford		
24	38	Tony Cosentino	Kart Idaho Racing	Ford		
Official qualifying results

== Race results ==
Fin	St	#	Driver	Team	Make	Laps	Led	Status	Pts
1	22	40	Ty Gibbs	Levin Racing with Joe Gibbs Racing	Toyota	108	38	running	48
2	1	21	Sam Mayer	GMS Racing	Chevrolet	108	63	running	42
3	16	16	Derek Kraus	Bill McAnally Racing	Toyota	108	0	running	40
4	17	19	Hailie Deegan	Bill McAnally Racing	Toyota	108	0	running	39
5	6	6	Jagger Jones	Sunrise Ford Racing	Ford	108	0	running	38
6	7	99	Brittney Zamora	Bill McAnally Racing	Toyota	108	0	running	37
7	24	55	Trenton Moriarity	Jefferson Pitts Racing	Chevrolet	108	0	running	36
8	4	9	Trevor Huddleston	Sunrise Ford Racing	Ford	108	0	running	35
9	18	13	Todd Souza	Central Coast Racing	Toyota	108	0	running	34
10	21	10	Riley Herbst	Levin Racing with Joe Gibbs Racing	Toyota	108	7	running	34
11	8	78	Jack Wood	Velocity Racing	Toyota	108	0	running	32
12	9	27	Matt Levin	JP Racing	Ford	107	0	running	31
13	20	7	Taylor Canfield	Jefferson Pitts Racing	Ford	106	0	running	30
14	10	08	Travis Milburn	Kart Idaho Racing	Chevrolet	106	0	running	29
15	11	77	Takuma Koga	Performance P-1 Racing	Toyota	104	0	running	28
16	13	8	Billy Kann	B&B Motorsports	Chevrolet	103	0	running	27
17	14	34	Josh Jackson	Stafford Smith	Ford	100	0	running	26
18	5	15	Drew Dollar	DGR-Crosley	Ford	95	0	crash	25
19	15	36	Bobby Hillis Jr.	Hillis Racing	Toyota	86	0	running	24
20	3	2	Ty Majeski	Chad Bryant Racing	Ford	78	0	crash	23
21	2	17	Zane Smith	Steve McGowan Motorsports	Ford	59	0	engine	22
22	23	18	Bill Kann	B&B Motorsports	Chevrolet	57	0	engine	21
23	19	38	Tony Cosentino	Kart Idaho Racing	Chevrolet	49	0	engine	20
24	12	37	Keith McGee	Kart Idaho Racing	Ford	15	0	engine	19
20	25	22	Corey Heim	Chad Bryant Racing	Ford	108	0	running	41
Withdrew
WD		0	Bobby Hillis Jr.	Hillis Racing	Toyota				
Official race results

Previous race: 2019 NAPA/ENEOS 150 presented by West Coast Stock Car Hall of Fame	NASCAR K&N Pro Series West; 2019 season	Next race: 2020 Star Nursery 150
