= 2020 Star Nursery 150 =

First race of the 2020 ARCA Menards Series West

Race details
- Race 1 of 11 of the 2020 ARCA Menards Series West
- Date: February 20, 2020
- Official name: 3rd Annual Star Nursery 150
- Location: Las Vegas Motor Speedway Bullring, North Las Vegas, Nevada
- Course: Permanent racing facility
- Course length: 0.604 km (0.375 miles)
- Distance: 150 laps, 56.25 mi (90.53 km)
- Scheduled distance: 150 laps, 56.25 mi (90.53 km)
- Average speed: 70.508 miles per hour (113.472 km/h)

Pole position
Driver	Sam Mayer	GMS Racing
- Time: 14.611

Most laps led
Driver	Sam Mayer	GMS Racing
- Laps: 138

Winner
No. 21	Sam Mayer	GMS Racing

Television in the United States
- Network: TrackPass
- Announcers: Charles Krall

Radio in the United States
- Radio: ARCA Racing Network

The 2020 Star Nursery 150 was the first stock car race of the 2020 ARCA Menards Series West season and the third iteration of the event. The race was held on Thursday, February 20, 2020, in North Las Vegas, Nevada, at the Las Vegas Motor Speedway Bullring, a 0.375 miles (0.604 km) low-banked permanent racetrack. The race took the scheduled 150 laps to complete. At race's end, Sam Mayer of GMS Racing would dominate the race to win his first and to date, final career ARCA Menards Series West win and his first and only win of the season. To fill out the podium, Jesse Love of Bill McAnally Racing and Blaine Perkins of Sunrise Ford Racing would finish second and third, respectively.

== Background ==
Las Vegas Motor Speedway, located in Clark County, Nevada outside the Las Vegas city limits and about 15 miles northeast of the Las Vegas Strip, is a 1,200-acre (490 ha) complex of multiple tracks for motorsports racing. The complex is owned by Speedway Motorsports, Inc., which is headquartered in Charlotte, North Carolina.

=== Entry list ===
- (R) denotes rookie driver.

#	Driver	Team	Make	Sponsor
0	Bobby Hillis Jr.	Hillis Racing	Toyota	Tucson Speedway, Hinkley's Lighting Factory
6	Trevor Huddleston	Sunrise Ford Racing	Ford	Sunrise Ford
7	Austin Reed	JP Racing	Ford	Approved Memory
08	Travis Milburn*	Kart Idaho Racing	Chevrolet	Kart Idaho, Mitchell Industrial Park
9	Blaine Perkins	Sunrise Ford Racing	Ford	Sunrise Ford
11	Chris Lowden	Kart Idaho Racing	Chevrolet	Just Ledook It
12	Lawless Alan	Bill McAnally Racing	Toyota	AUTOParkIt
13	Todd Souza	Central Coast Racing	Toyota	Central Coast Cabinets
16	Gio Scelzi (R)	Bill McAnally Racing	Toyota	NAPA Auto Parts
17	Zach Telford	Zach Telford Racing	Chevrolet	Builders FirstSource
19	Jesse Love (R)	Bill McAnally Racing	Toyota	NAPA Power Premium Plus
21	Sam Mayer	GMS Racing	Chevrolet	Spencer Clark Foundation
38	?*	Kart Idaho Racing	Toyota	
50	Holley Hollan	Bill McAnally Racing	Toyota	JBL
54	Joey Iest	Naake-Klauer Motorsports	Toyota	Richmond Meat Company, The Ag Center
77	Takuma Koga	Performance P-1 Motorsports	Toyota	Koshi no Kanbai Brewery
78	Jack Wood	Velocity Racing	Toyota	Velocity Racing
88	Bridget Burgess	BMI Racing	Chevrolet	Gear Off Road
99	Gracie Trotter (R)	Bill McAnally Racing	Toyota	Eneos
Official entry list

*Withdrew.

== Practice ==
=== First practice ===
The first practice session was held on Thursday, February 20, and would last for 45 minutes. Sam Mayer of GMS Racing would set the fastest time in the session, with a time of 15.016 and an average speed of 89.904 miles per hour (144.686 km/h).

Pos.	#	Driver	Team	Make	Time	Speed
1	21	Sam Mayer	GMS Racing	Chevrolet	15.016	89.904
2	16	Gio Scelzi	Bill McAnally Racing	Toyota	15.030	89.820
3	19	Jesse Love	Bill McAnally Racing	Toyota	15.062	89.630
Full first practice results

=== Second practice ===
The second and final practice session, sometimes referred to as Happy Hour, was held on Thursday, February 20, and would last for 45 minutes. Sam Mayer of GMS Racing would set the fastest time in the session, with a time of 14.731 and an average speed of 91.643 miles per hour (147.485 km/h).

Pos.	#	Driver	Team	Make	Time	Speed
1	21	Sam Mayer	GMS Racing	Chevrolet	14.731	91.643
2	19	Jesse Love	Bill McAnally Racing	Toyota	14.988	90.072
3	16	Gio Scelzi	Bill McAnally Racing	Toyota	15.037	89.779
Full Happy Hour practice results

== Qualifying ==
Qualifying was held on Thursday, February 20, at 5:00 PM PST. Each driver would have two laps to set a fastest time; the fastest of the two would count as their official qualifying lap.

Sam Mayer of GMS Racing would win the pole, setting a time of 14.611 and an average speed of 92.396 miles per hour (148.697 km/h).

=== Full qualifying results ===
Pos.	#	Driver	Team	Make	Time	Speed
1	21	Sam Mayer	GMS Racing	Chevrolet	14.611	92.396
2	19	Jesse Love	Bill McAnally Racing	Toyota	14.740	91.588
3	54	Joey Iest	Naake-Klauer Motorsports	Toyota	15.034	89.796
4	99	Gracie Trotter	Bill McAnally Racing	Toyota	15.052	89.689
5	9	Blaine Perkins	Sunrise Ford Racing	Ford	15.102	89.392
6	6	Trevor Huddleston	Sunrise Ford Racing	Ford	15.123	89.268
7	78	Jack Wood	Velocity Racing	Toyota	15.140	89.168
8	13	Todd Souza	Central Coast Racing	Toyota	15.143	89.150
9	16	Gio Scelzi	Bill McAnally Racing	Toyota	15.145	89.138
10	12	Lawless Alan	Bill McAnally Racing	Toyota	15.176	88.956
11	7	Austin Reed	JP Racing	Ford	15.290	88.293
12	17	Zach Telford	Zach Telford Racing	Chevrolet	15.437	87.452
13	77	Takuma Koga	Performance P-1 Motorsports	Toyota	15.513	87.024
14	50	Holley Hollan	Bill McAnally Racing	Toyota	15.597	86.555
15	11	Chris Lowden	Kart Idaho Racing	Chevrolet	15.763	85.644
16	88	Bridget Burgess	BMI Racing	Chevrolet	17.142	78.754
17	0	Bobby Hillis Jr.	Hillis Racing	Toyota	17.585	76.770
Withdrew
WD	08	Travis Milburn	Kart Idaho Racing	Chevrolet	—	—
WD	38	?	Kart Idaho Racing	Toyota	—	—
Official qualifying results

== Race results ==
Fin	St	#	Driver	Team	Make	Laps	Led	Status	Pts
1	1	21	Sam Mayer	GMS Racing	Chevrolet	150	138	running	49
2	2	19	Jesse Love (R)	Bill McAnally Racing	Toyota	150	12	running	43
3	5	9	Blaine Perkins	Sunrise Ford Racing	Ford	150	0	running	41
4	4	99	Gracie Trotter (R)	Bill McAnally Racing	Toyota	150	0	running	40
5	6	6	Trevor Huddleston	Sunrise Ford Racing	Ford	150	0	running	39
6	10	12	Lawless Alan	Bill McAnally Racing	Toyota	150	0	running	38
7	7	78	Jack Wood	Velocity Racing	Toyota	150	0	running	37
8	8	13	Todd Souza	Central Coast Racing	Toyota	150	0	running	36
9	11	7	Austin Reed	JP Racing	Ford	149	0	running	35
10	9	16	Gio Scelzi (R)	Bill McAnally Racing	Toyota	148	0	running	34
11	13	77	Takuma Koga	Performance P-1 Motorsports	Toyota	147	0	running	33
12	14	50	Holley Hollan	Bill McAnally Racing	Toyota	147	0	running	32
13	17	0	Bobby Hillis Jr.	Hillis Racing	Toyota	137	0	running	31
14	3	54	Joey Iest	Naake-Klauer Motorsports	Toyota	105	0	running	30
15	15	11	Chris Lowden	Kart Idaho Racing	Chevrolet	98	0	brakes	29
16	12	17	Zach Telford	Zach Telford Racing	Chevrolet	79	0	brakes	28
17	16	88	Bridget Burgess	BMI Racing	Chevrolet	40	0	rear gear	27
Withdrew
WD		08	Travis Milburn	Kart Idaho Racing	Chevrolet				
WD		38	?	Kart Idaho Racing	Toyota				
Official race results

Previous race: 2019 Arizona Lottery 100	ARCA Menards Series West; 2020 season	Next race: 2020 ENEOS/Sunrise Ford Twin 30s Race 1
