= Kody Vanderwal =

American auto racing driver (born 2001)

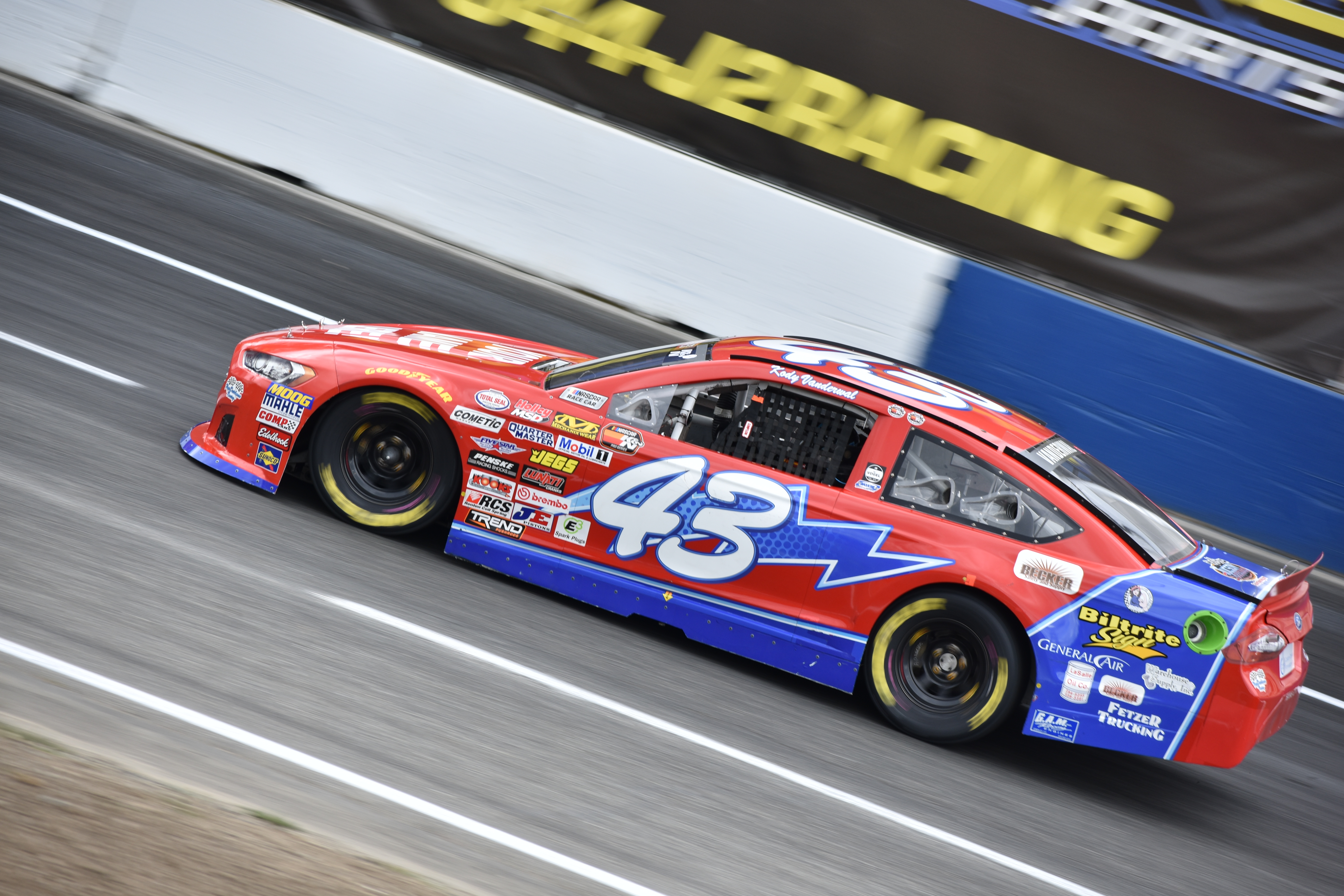
- Vanderwal during qualifying at Evergreen in 2018
- Born: Kody S. Vanderwal; January 19, 2001 (age 25); LaSalle, Colorado, U.S.

NASCAR O'Reilly Auto Parts Series career
- 30 races run over 1 year
- 2020 position: 30th
- Best finish: 30th (2020)
- First race: 2020 LS Tractor 200 (Phoenix)
- Last race: 2020 Desert Diamond Casino West Valley 200 (Phoenix)
| Wins | Top tens | Poles |
|---|---|---|
| 0 | 0 | 0 |
- Statistics up to date as of November 7, 2020.

Kody S. Vanderwal (born January 19, 2001) is an American former professional stock car racing driver. He last competed part-time in the NASCAR Xfinity Series, driving the No. 52 Chevrolet Camaro for Jimmy Means Racing.

== Racing career ==
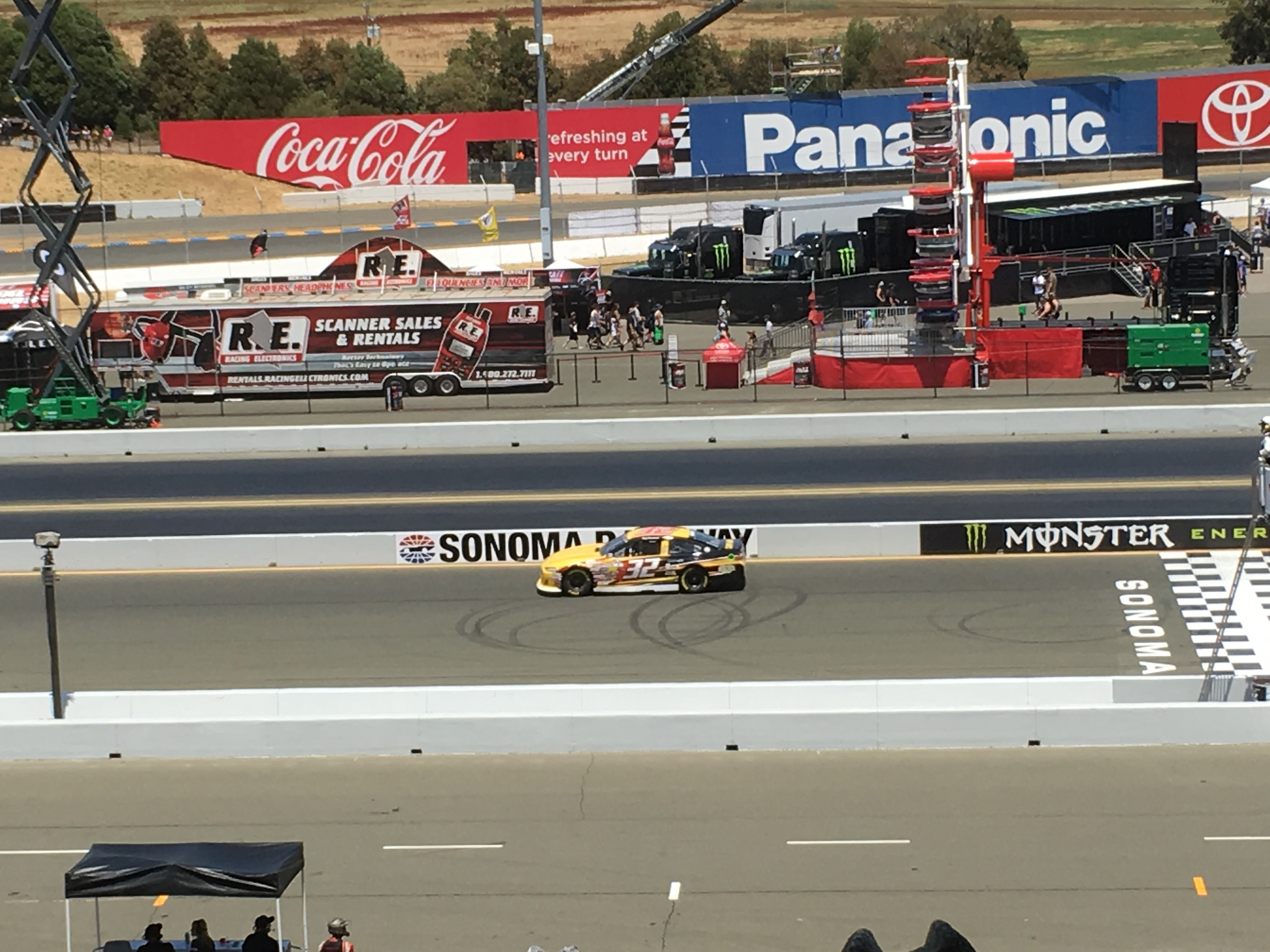
Vanderwal running the K&N West race at Sonoma Raceway in 2017

Vanderwal's racing career began at the age of eleven at a local dirt track in Fort Morgan, Colorado, where he drove an "Enduro" stock car for several years. Vanderwal started racing Pure Stocks at Colorado National Speedway in 2015 and later went on to run Super Stocks, Pro-Trucks, and Super Late Models. In 2017, Vanderwal was offered a ride in the NASCAR K&N Pro Series West. He ran a full season, earning two top fives and would go on to finish ninth in points standings.

Vanderwal's 2018 season was highlighted by winning both K&N West races at Tucson in May.

In 2019, Vanderwal moved from Patriot Motorsports Group to Levin Racing, bringing the No. 43 with him. He qualified on the pole at Colorado, converting it into a second-place finish in the race. In total, Vanderwal ran each of the season's first seven races before transitioning his focus to weekly racing at Colorado and finding sponsorship for the 2020 season.

In 2020, Vanderwal joined Jimmy Means Racing in the NASCAR Xfinity Series, running all but the first three races. He finished 30th in points with a best race finish of 19th at Pocono Raceway. Vanderwal did not return to the team in 2021 due to sponsorship issues.

== Personal life ==
Vanderwal's father, Rudy, also has previously participated in the West Series, and is the owner of IBA Dairy Depot & Advanced Dairy Service, which sponsored Kody during the 2020 season.

== Motorsports career results ==
=== Racing career summary ===
| Season | Series | Team | Races | Wins | Top 5 | Top 10 | Points | Position |
|---|---|---|---|---|---|---|---|---|
| 2017 | NASCAR K&N Pro Series West | Patriot Motorsports Group | 14 | 0 | 2 | 7 | 440 | 9th |
| 2018 | NASCAR K&N Pro Series West | Patriot Motorsports Group | 14 | 2 | 4 | 8 | 479 | 7th |
| 2018 | NASCAR K&N Pro Series East | Patriot Motorsports Group | 3 | 0 | 0 | 0 | 86 | 27th |
| 2019 | NASCAR K&N Pro Series West | Levin Racing | 7 | 0 | 2 | 3 | 239 | 11th |
| 2020 | NASCAR Xfinity Series | Jimmy Means Racing | 30 | 0 | 0 | 0 | 263 | 30th |

=== NASCAR ===
(key) (Bold – Pole position awarded by qualifying time. Italics – Pole position earned by points standings or practice time. * – Most laps led.)

==== Xfinity Series ====
NASCAR Xfinity Series results
| Year | Team | No. | Make | 1 | 2 | 3 | 4 | 5 | 6 | 7 | 8 | 9 | 10 | 11 | 12 | 13 | 14 | 15 | 16 | 17 | 18 | 19 | 20 | 21 | 22 | 23 | 24 | 25 | 26 | 27 | 28 | 29 | 30 | 31 | 32 | 33 | NXSC | Pts | Ref |
|---|---|---|---|---|---|---|---|---|---|---|---|---|---|---|---|---|---|---|---|---|---|---|---|---|---|---|---|---|---|---|---|---|---|---|---|---|---|---|---|
| 2020 | Jimmy Means Racing | 52 | Chevy | DAY | LVS | CAL | PHO; 29 | DAR; 32 | CLT; 35 | BRI; 21 | ATL; 37 | HOM; 37 | HOM; 33 | TAL; 31 | POC; 19 | IRC; 28 | KEN; 25 | KEN; 29 | TEX; 32 | KAN; 27 | ROA; 27 | DRC; 23 | DOV; 31 | DOV; 27 | DAY; 34 | DAR; 29 | RCH; 28 | RCH; 29 | BRI; 29 | LVS; 31 | TAL; 28 | ROV; 20 | KAN; 26 | TEX; 21 | MAR; 29 | PHO; 22 | 30th | 263 | |

==== K&N Pro Series East ====
NASCAR K&N Pro Series East results
| Year | Team | No. | Make | 1 | 2 | 3 | 4 | 5 | 6 | 7 | 8 | 9 | 10 | 11 | 12 | 13 | 14 | NKNPSEC | Pts | Ref |
|---|---|---|---|---|---|---|---|---|---|---|---|---|---|---|---|---|---|---|---|---|
| 2018 | Patriot Motorsports Group | 34 | Toyota | NSM; 11 | BRI | LGY | SBO | SBO | MEM | NJM | THO | NHA | | | | | | 27th | 86 | |
| 2018 | Patriot Motorsports Group | 43 | Toyota | | | | | | | | | | IOW; 19 | GLN | | | | 27th | 86 | |
| 2018 | Patriot Motorsports Group | 43 | Ford | | | | | | | | | | | | GTW; 16 | NHA | DOV | 27th | 86 | |

==== K&N Pro Series West ====
NASCAR K&N Pro Series West results
| Year | Team | No. | Make | 1 | 2 | 3 | 4 | 5 | 6 | 7 | 8 | 9 | 10 | 11 | 12 | 13 | 14 | NKNPSWC | Pts | Ref |
|---|---|---|---|---|---|---|---|---|---|---|---|---|---|---|---|---|---|---|---|---|
| 2017 | Patriot Motorsports Group | 32 | Ford | TUS; 8 | KCR; 9 | IRW; 14 | IRW; 15 | SPO; 10 | OSS; 4 | CNS; 5 | SON; 15 | IOW; 34 | EVG; 14 | DCS; 15 | MER; 6 | AAS; 9 | KCR; 18 | 9th | 440 | |
| 2018 | Patriot Motorsports Group | 43 | Ford | KCR; 21 | TUS; 1* | TUS; 1 | OSS; 7 | CNS; 7 | SON; 17 | DCS; 3 | | EVG; 4 | GTW; 16 | LVS; 20 | MER; 9 | AAS; 13 | KCR; 8 | 7th | 479 | |
| 2018 | Patriot Motorsports Group | 43 | Toyota | | | | | | | | IOW; 19 | | | | | | | 7th | 479 | |
| 2019 | Levin Racing | 43 | Chevy | LVS; 4 | | | | | SON; 15 | DCS; 8 | IOW | EVG | GTW | MER | AAS | KCR | PHO | 11th | 239 | |
| 2019 | Levin Racing | 43 | Ford | | IRW; 18 | TUS; 11 | TUS; 12 | **CNS**; 2 | | | | | | | | | | 11th | 239 | |

^{*} Season still in progress
^{1} Ineligible for series points
