= Brittney Zamora =

American racing driver (born 1999)

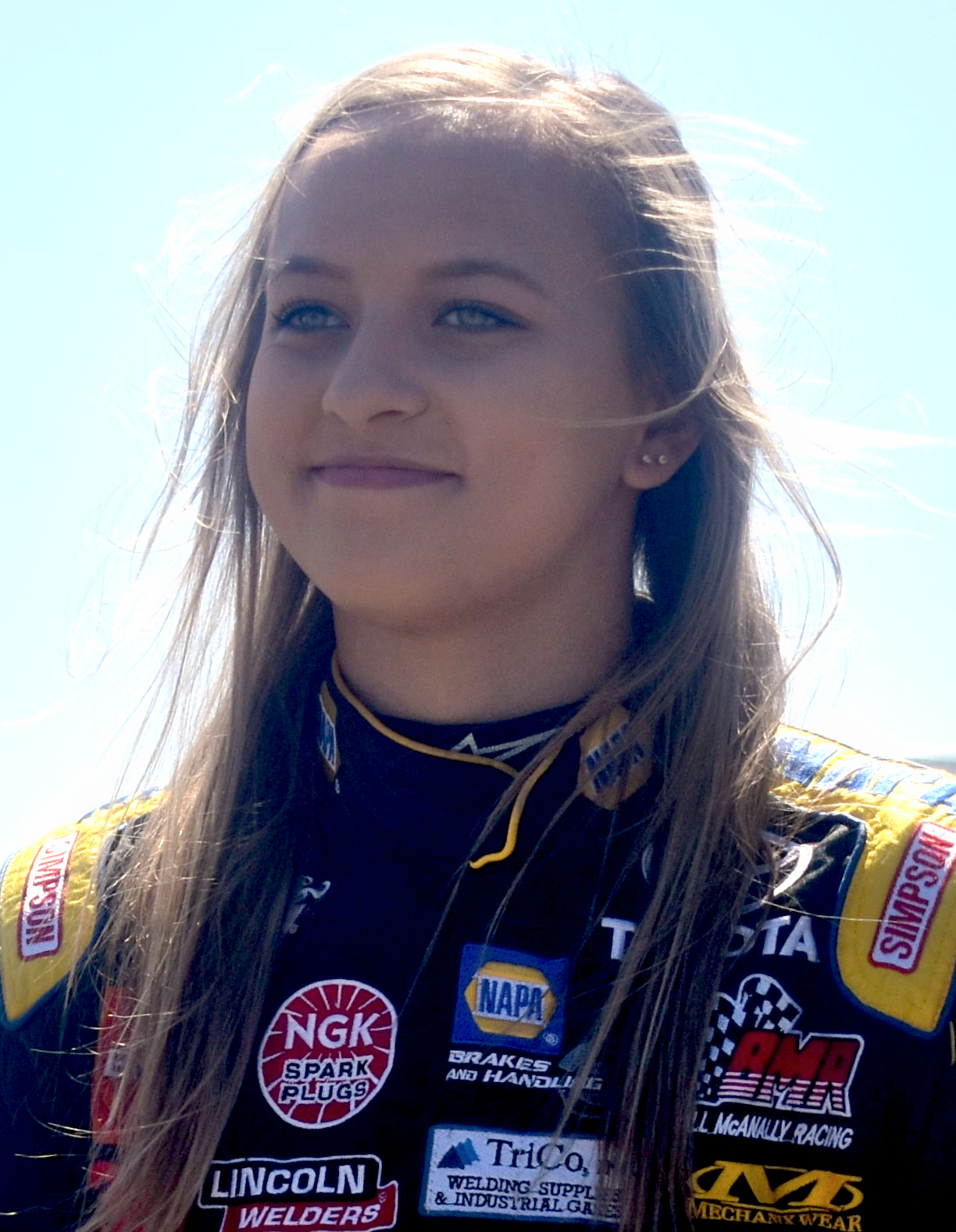
- Zamora at Sonoma Raceway in 2019
- Born: April 27, 1999 (age 27) Kennewick, Washington, U.S.

ARCA Menards Series career
- Debut season: 2021
- Current team: Rette Jones Racing
- Car number: 30
- Engine: Ford
- Crew chief: Mark Rette
- Championships: 0
- Wins: 0
- Poles: 0

ARCA Menards Series West career
- Debut season: 2019
- Former teams: Bill McAnally Racing, Jefferson Racing
- Starts: 15
- Championships: 0
- Wins: 0
- Poles: 2
- Best finish: 5th in 2019

Previous series
- 2017–2018 2019: Northwest Super Late Model Series; ARCA Menards Series East
- Statistics up to date as of February 6, 2021.

Brittney Zamora (born April 27, 1999) is an American professional stock car racing driver who last competed part-time in the ARCA Menards Series, driving the No. 30 Ford for Rette Jones Racing. She previously drove for Bill McAnally Racing full-time in the ARCA Menards Series West and part-time in the ARCA Menards Series East.

== Racing career ==
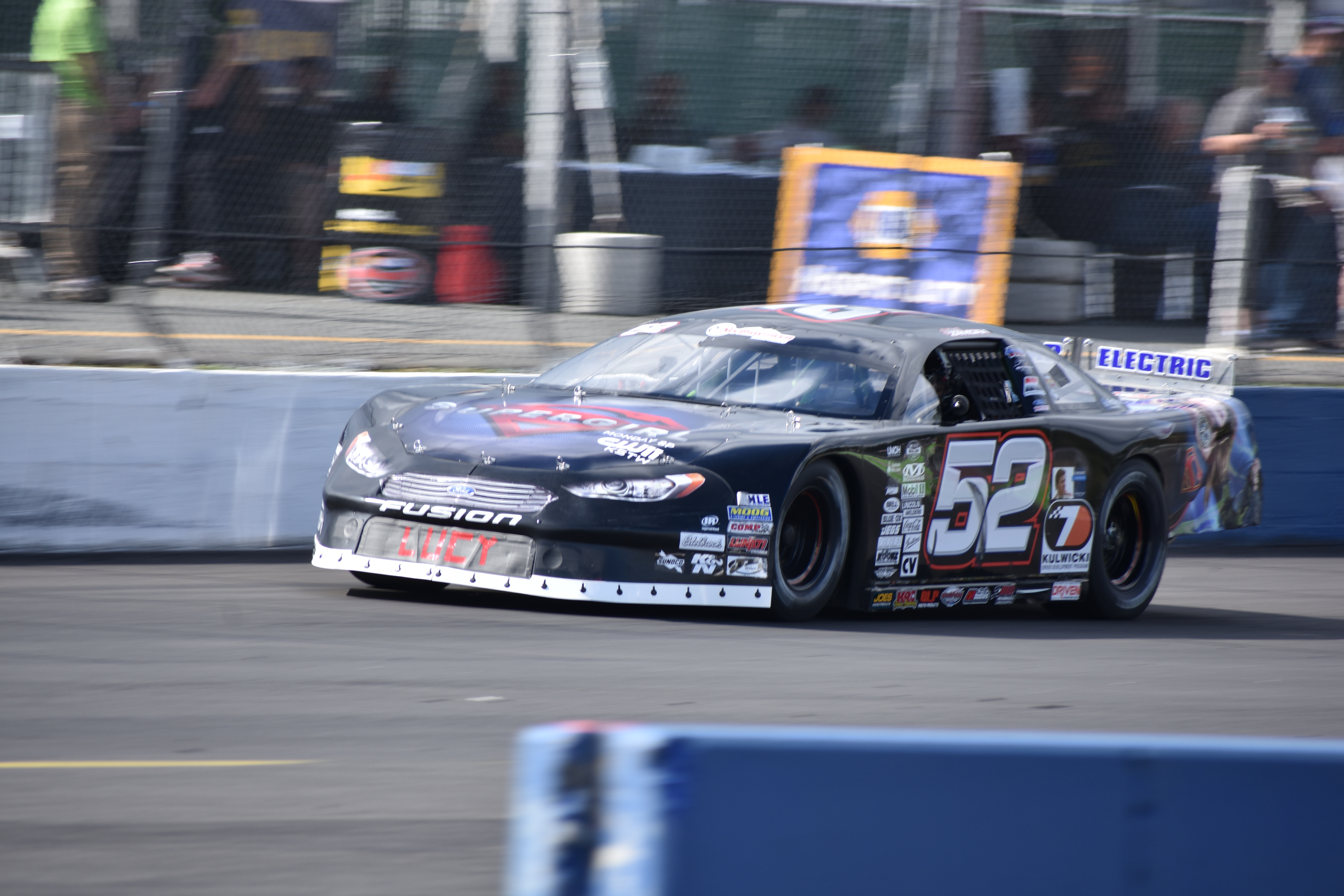
Zamora at Evergreen Speedway in 2018

Before entering NASCAR, Zamora traveled the super late model racing circuit in Washington and Oregon. She drove in the Northwest Super Late Model Series in 2017 and 2018, and became the first female to win a race and a championship in the series. In both years racing in that series, she won the championship. In 2018, Zamora was the Washington State Rookie of the Year in NASCAR's Whelen All-American Series. She was one of 12 drivers invited to NASCAR's 2019 Drive for Diversity combine.

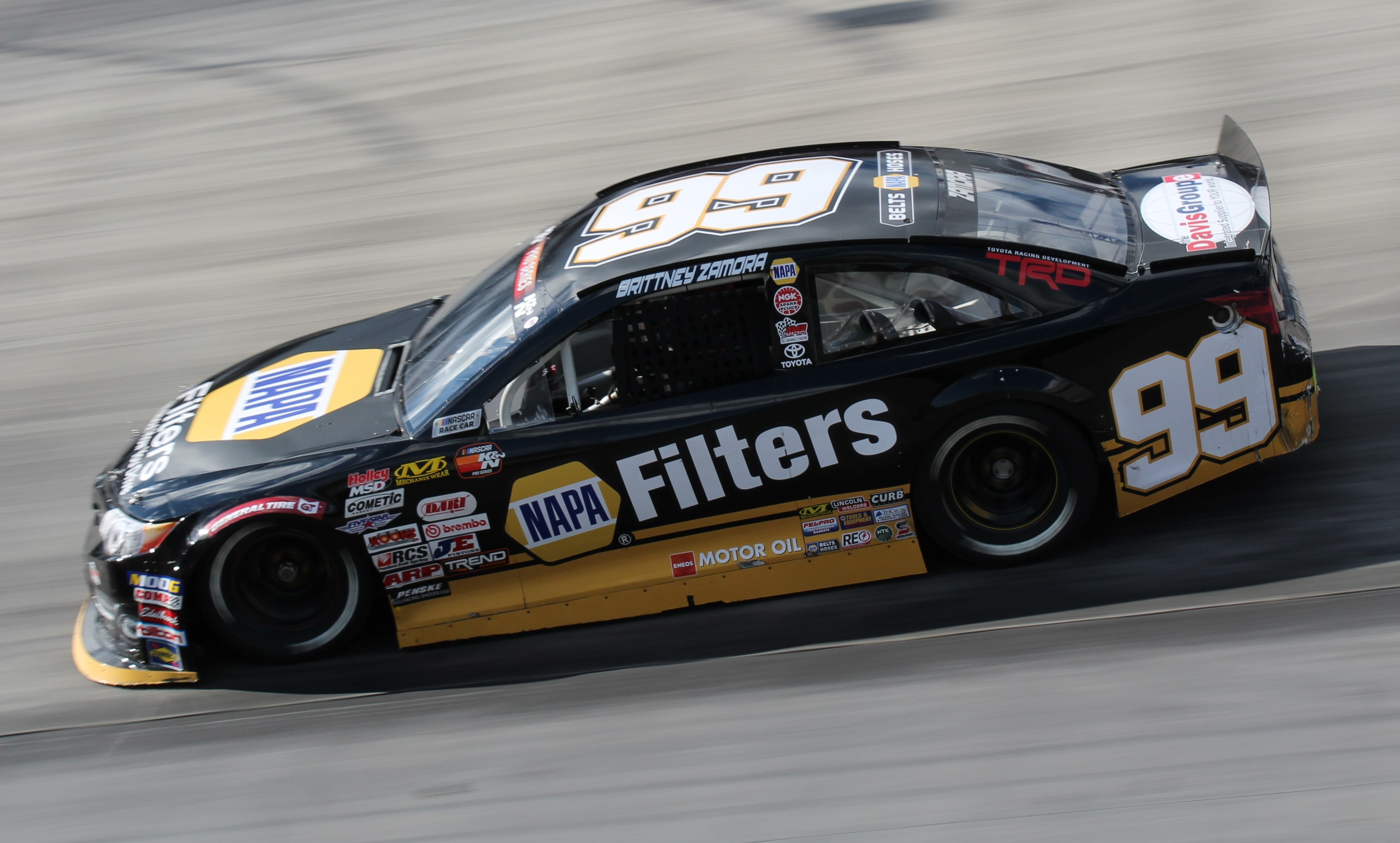
Zamora's K&N Pro Series car at Bristol in 2019

In January 2019, Zamora was confirmed as the driver of the No. 99 Toyota Camry for Bill McAnally Racing, competing full-time in the K&N Pro Series West and part-time in the K&N Pro Series East.

McAnally announced their 2020 West Series driver lineup on January 14, 2020, and Zamora was not included. She was replaced by rookie driver Gracie Trotter in the team's No. 99 for the full season.

Zamora announced on March 16, 2020, that she would be returning to the West Series, competing in the No. 42 Ford for Jefferson Racing in the race at Irwindale Speedway. This ended up being her only stock car start of the season.

In 2021, Zamora debuted in the ARCA Menards Series by participating in the series' preseason test session in January at Daytona ahead of the season-opening race there in February. Zamora drove for driver Eric Caudell in his own No. 7 car during the test session. When Caudell returned as the driver of his car for the Daytona race, Zamora drove for Rette Jones Racing in their No. 30.

On October 9, 2021, Zamora won a 100-lap Pro Late Model feature race at Nashville Fairgrounds Speedway, becoming the first woman to win a race in the track's premier division.

== Motorsports career results ==
=== NASCAR ===
(key) (Bold – Pole position awarded by qualifying time. Italics – Pole position earned by points standings or practice time. * – Most laps led.)

==== K&N Pro Series East ====
NASCAR K&N Pro Series East results
Year	Team	No.	Make	1	2	3	4	5	6	7	8	9	10	11	12	NKNPSEC	Pts	Ref
2019	Bill McAnally Racing	99	Toyota	NSM; 15	BRI; 11	SBO	SBO	MEM; 9	NHA; 12	IOW; 20	GLN	BRI	GTW; 16	NHA	DOV	11th	181	

=== ARCA Menards Series ===
(key) (Bold – Pole position awarded by qualifying time. Italics – Pole position earned by points standings or practice time. * – Most laps led.)

ARCA Menards Series results
Year	Team	No.	Make	1	2	3	4	5	6	7	8	9	10	11	12	13	14	15	16	17	18	19	20	AMSC	Pts	Ref
2021	Rette Jones Racing	30	Ford	DAY; 34	PHO	TAL	KAN	TOL	CLT	MOH	POC	ELK	BLN	IOW	WIN	GLN	MCH	ISF	MLW	DSF	BRI	SLM	KAN	117th	10	

==== ARCA Menards Series West ====
ARCA Menards Series West results
Year	Team	No.	Make	1	2	3	4	5	6	7	8	9	10	11	12	13	14	AMSW	Pts	Ref
2019	Bill McAnally Racing	99	Toyota	LVS; 11	IRW; 8	TUS; 5	**TUS**; 3	CNS; 4	SON; 29	DCS; 5	IOW; 20	**EVG**; 3	GTW; 16	MER; 8	AAS; 6	KCR; 4	PHO; 6	5th	490	
2020	Jefferson Racing	42	Ford	LVS	MMP	MMP	IRW; 13	EVG	DCS	CNS	LVS	AAS	KCR	PHO				37th	31	

=== CARS Super Late Model Tour ===
(key)

CARS Super Late Model Tour results
Year	Team	No.	Make	1	2	3	4	5	6	7	8	CSLMTC	Pts	Ref
2020	N/A	10	Toyota	SNM	HCY	JEN	HCY	FCS	BRI	FLC	NSH; 11	N/A	0	

=== SMART Modified Tour ===
SMART Modified Tour results
Year	Car owner	No.	Make	1	2	3	4	5	6	7	8	9	10	11	12	SMTC	Pts	Ref
2023	Brian Weber	01	Troyer	FLO	CRW	SBO	HCY	FCS	CRW; 26	ACE	CAR	PUL	TRI	SBO	ROU	54th	15	
