= Dylan Garner =

American racing driver (born 1998)

- Nationality: American
- Born: November 11, 1998 (age 27) Yorba Linda, California, U.S.

NASCAR K&N Pro Series West career
- Debut season: 2019
- Current team: Bill McAnally Racing
- Years active: 2019
- Car number: 50
- Starts: 3
- Championships: 0
- Wins: 0
- Poles: 0
- Statistics up to date as of October 14, 2019.

Dylan Garner (born November 11, 1998) is an American professional stock car racing driver who currently competes in the zMAX CARS Tour, driving the No. 97 Chevrolet for Dylan Garner Racing. He previously competed part-time in the NASCAR K&N Pro Series West, driving the No. 50 Toyota Camry for Bill McAnally Racing.

== Racing career ==
Garner began racing in the SPEARS SRL Limited Late Model Division in 2014 on a limited basis, running a handful of series races. His true rookie season came in 2015, in which he won the series championship, winning three of ten races in which he competed.

=== NASCAR ===
In his early NASCAR career, Garner competed primarily in his home state of California. He won NASCAR California State rookie honors at the Whelen All-American Series level in 2016. In 2017, Garner ranked tenth nationally in the series' late model division points standings, scoring 21 top-fives and 27 top-tens in 27 combined starts at Irwindale Speedway and Kern County Raceway Park.

Garner began the 2018 season as one of 21 semifinalists for seven spots in the 2018 Kulwicki Driver Development Program. His 2018 series schedule included nineteen races, fifteen of which saw him finish in the top-ten. He began the season as a 2019 program semifinalist as well, though he eventually accepted a part-time drive in the NASCAR K&N Pro Series West.

==== K&N Pro Series ====
On March 30, 2019, Garner made his debut in the K&N Pro Series West for Bill McAnally Racing (BMR), driving the No. 50 Toyota Camry at Irwindale. He scored a top-ten on debut for the team, finishing ninth in the race. Garner returned to BMR for the races at Roseville and Kern County.

== Personal life ==
Garner is from Yorba Linda, California. He is the youngest of three children. With the Garner family originally hailing from Canada, Dylan was the only one of the three born in the United States. Garner is a third-generation driver; his grandfather, Doug, competed in CASCAR while his father, Brad, began assisting Doug with building his cars at the age of fourteen.

== Motorsports career results ==
=== Career summary ===
Season	Series	Team	Car No.	Races	Wins	Top fives	Top tens	Poles	Laps led	Position	Points	Ref
2019	NASCAR K&N Pro Series West	Bill McAnally Racing	50	3	0	0	2	0	0	21st	104	

=== NASCAR ===
(key) (Bold – Pole position awarded by qualifying time. Italics – Pole position earned by points standings or practice time. * – Most laps led.)

==== K&N Pro Series West ====
NASCAR K&N Pro Series West results
Year	Team	No.	Make	1	2	3	4	5	6	7	8	9	10	11	12	13	14	NKNPSWC	Pts	Ref
2019	Bill McAnally Racing	50	Toyota	LVS	IRW; 9	TUS	TUS	CNS	SON	DCS	IOW	EVG	GTW	MER	AAS; 12	KCR; 7	PHO	21st	104	

=== CARS Pro Late Model Tour ===
(key)

CARS Pro Late Model Tour results
Year	Team	No.	Make	1	2	3	4	5	6	7	8	9	10	11	12	13	CPLMTC	Pts	Ref
2023	Dylan Garner Racing	97	Chevy	SNM; 21	HCY; 18	ACE	NWS	TCM	DIL	CRW	WKS	HCY	TCM	SBO	TCM	CRW	47th	27	
2024	Dylan Garner Racing	97	Chevy	SNM; 16	HCY; 13	OCS; 18	ACE; 12	TCM; 11	CRW; 17	HCY; 14	NWS; 21	ACE	FLC; 9	SBO; 14	TCM; 9	NWS; 9	8th	232	
2025	Dylan Garner Racing	97	Chevy	AAS; 6	CDL; 9	OCS; 10	ACE; 9	NWS; 13	CRW; 14	HCY; 14	HCY; 20	AND; 6	FLC; 10	SBO; 8	TCM; 9	NWS; 13	3rd	405	
2026	Dylan Garner Racing	97	Chevy	SNM; 16	NSV; 22	CRW; 6	ACE; 14	NWS; 16	HCY; 11	AND; 10	FLC; 10	TCM; 17	NPS; 13	SBO; 15			9th	313	

=== ASA STARS National Tour ===
(key) (Bold – Pole position awarded by qualifying time. Italics – Pole position earned by points standings or practice time. * – Most laps led. ** – All laps led.)

ASA STARS National Tour results
Year	Team	No.	Make	1	2	3	4	5	6	7	8	9	10	ASNTC	Pts	Ref
2023	Dylan Garner Racing	97	Chevy	FIF	MAD	NWS; DNQ	HCY	MLW	AND	WIR	TOL	WIN	NSV	119th	5	
