= 2019 NASCAR K&N Pro Series West =

NASCAR sanctioned auto racing series

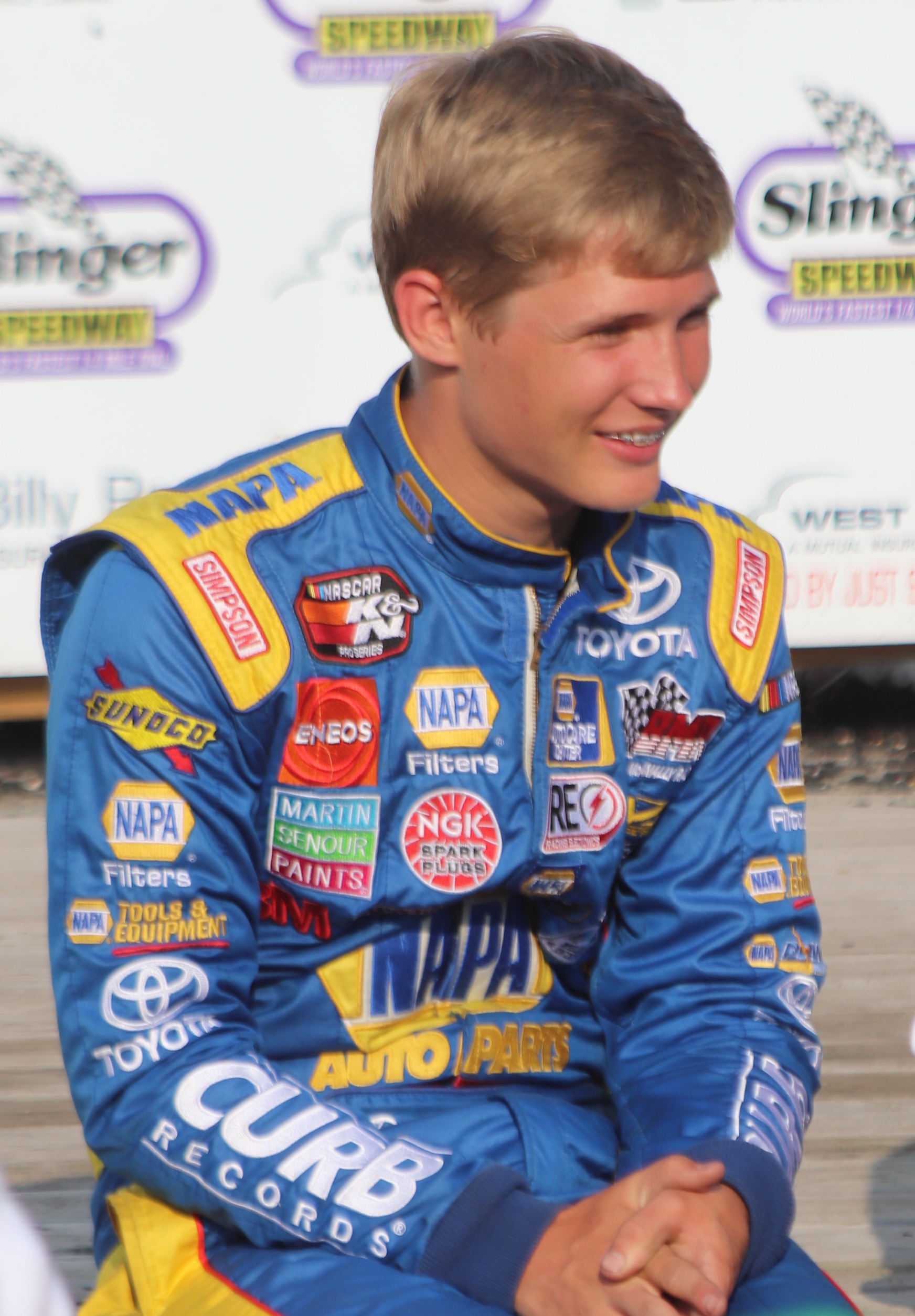
Derek Kraus, the 2019 K&N Pro Series West champion.

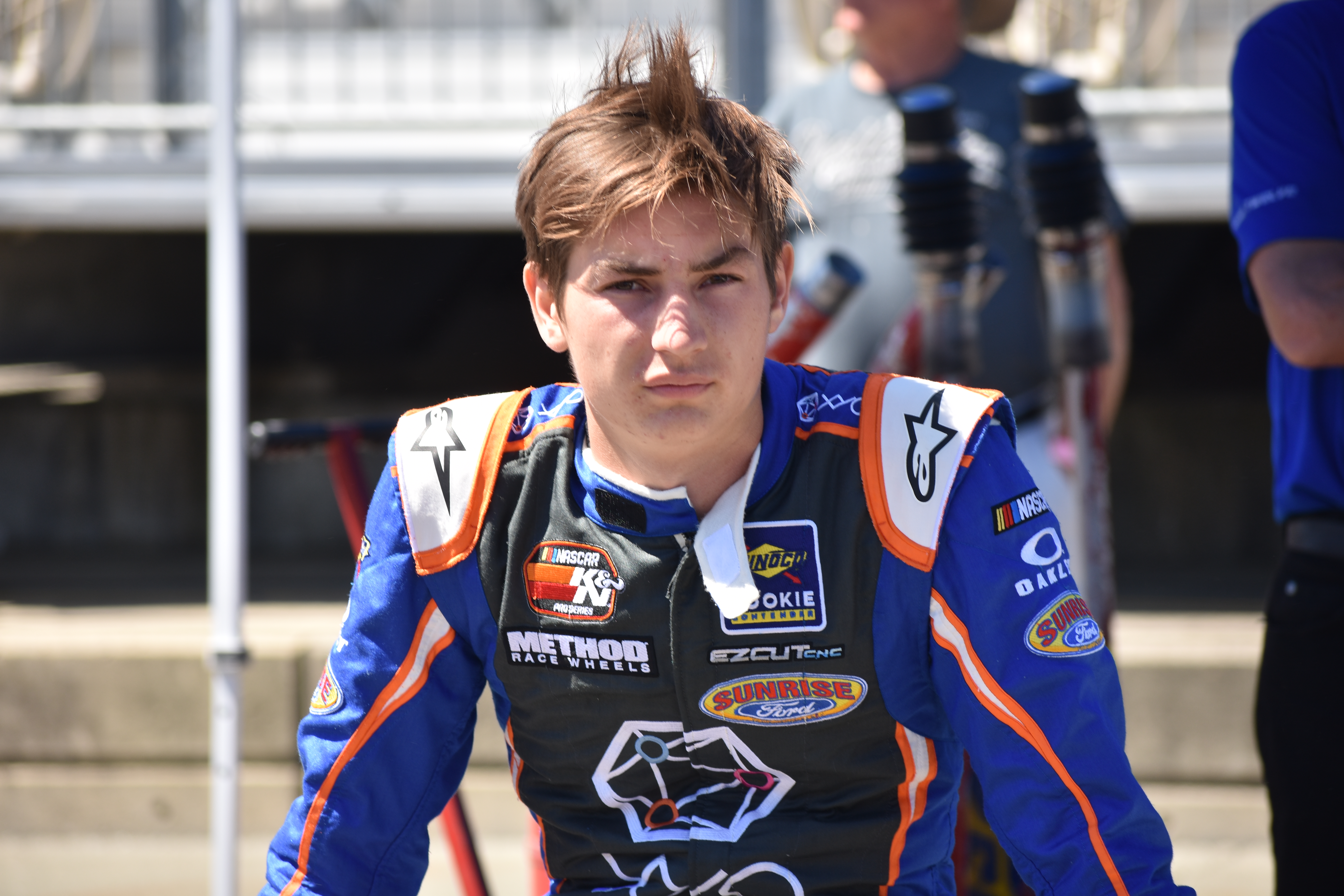
Jagger Jones finished second behind Kraus in the championship by 49 points.

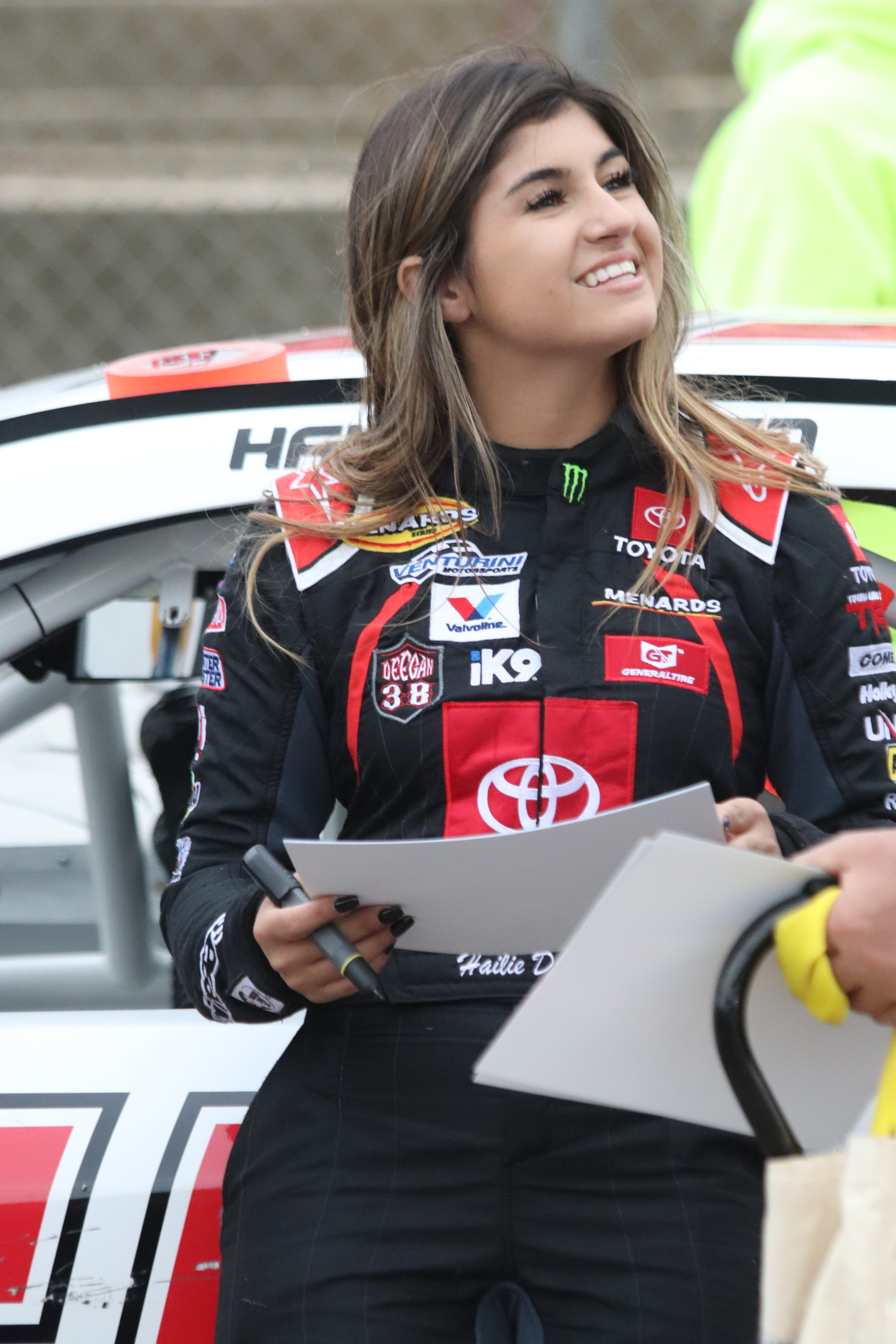
Hailie Deegan finished third in the championship.

The 2019 NASCAR K&N Pro Series West was the sixty-sixth season of the K&N Pro Series West, a regional stock car racing series sanctioned by NASCAR. It began with the Star Nursery 100 at the Las Vegas Motor Speedway dirt track on February 28, 2019, and concluded with the Arizona Lottery 100 at ISM Raceway on November 9, 2019. Derek Kraus was crowned the champion, ahead of Jagger Jones (who also won Rookie of the Year), Hailie Deegan, and Trevor Huddleston. Derek Thorn entered the season as the defending drivers' champion, but did not defend his championship, deciding instead to focus on super late model racing.

General Tire replaced Goodyear as the official tire supplier of the series in 2019. 2019 also marked the last year of sponsorship from K&N Filters, which began sponsoring the series in 2010. Beginning in 2020, the series was known as the ARCA Menards Series West.

== Teams and drivers ==
=== Complete schedule ===
Manufacturer	Team	No.	Driver	Crew chief
Ford	Sunrise Ford Racing	6	Jagger Jones (R)	Bill Sedgwick
Ford	Sunrise Ford Racing	9	Trevor Huddleston	Clinton Cram
Toyota	Bill McAnally Racing	16	Derek Kraus	John Camilleri
Toyota	Bill McAnally Racing	19	Hailie Deegan	Kevin Reed Jr.2; Kyle Wolosek 12
Toyota	Bill McAnally Racing	99	Brittney Zamora (R)	Kevin Bellicourt
Toyota	Central Coast Racing	13	Todd Souza	Michael Muñoz
Toyota	Performance P–1 Motorsports	77	Takuma Koga	Roger Bracken
Ford 2 Chevrolet 12	Kart Idaho Racing	08	Travis Milburn	Sonny Wahl 11; Unknown 3
Ford 3 Chevrolet 9 Toyota 2	Kart Idaho Racing	38	Rob Powers (R) 1	Mike Holleran 6 Unknown 5 John Wood 1 Stafford Smith 1 Kevin McCarty 1
Ford 3 Chevrolet 9 Toyota 2	Kart Idaho Racing	38	Armani Williams (R) 1	Mike Holleran 6 Unknown 5 John Wood 1 Stafford Smith 1 Kevin McCarty 1
Ford 3 Chevrolet 9 Toyota 2	Kart Idaho Racing	38	John Wood 8	Mike Holleran 6 Unknown 5 John Wood 1 Stafford Smith 1 Kevin McCarty 1
Ford 3 Chevrolet 9 Toyota 2	Kart Idaho Racing	38	Ron Jay (R) 1	Mike Holleran 6 Unknown 5 John Wood 1 Stafford Smith 1 Kevin McCarty 1
Ford 3 Chevrolet 9 Toyota 2	Kart Idaho Racing	38	Josh Fanopoulos 1	Mike Holleran 6 Unknown 5 John Wood 1 Stafford Smith 1 Kevin McCarty 1
Ford 3 Chevrolet 9 Toyota 2	Kart Idaho Racing	38	Taylor Canfield 1	Mike Holleran 6 Unknown 5 John Wood 1 Stafford Smith 1 Kevin McCarty 1
Ford 3 Chevrolet 9 Toyota 2	Kart Idaho Racing	38	Tony Cosentino (R) 1	Mike Holleran 6 Unknown 5 John Wood 1 Stafford Smith 1 Kevin McCarty 1

=== Limited schedule ===
Manufacturer	Team	No.	Driver	Crew chief	Rounds
Chevrolet	1/4 Ley Racing	32	Dale Quarterley	Alex Quarterley	1
Chevrolet	B&B Motorsports	8	Billy Kann	Steve Elder	3
Chevrolet	B&B Motorsports	18	Bill Kann	Kevin Loster	5
Chevrolet	Carlos Vieira Racing	51	Carlos Vieira	Unknown	1
Chevrolet	Cooley Racing	31	James Cooley (R)	Unknown	1
Chevrolet	DeLong Racing	84	Rich DeLong III	Chris Dittes 2 Rich DeLong III 1	3
Chevrolet	GMS Racing	21	Sam Mayer (R)	Mardy Lindley	1
Chevrolet	Jefferson Pitts Racing	3	Austin Dillon	Robert Strmiska	1
Chevrolet	Jefferson Pitts Racing	47	Ryan Preece (R)	Jeff Jefferson	1
Chevrolet	Levin Racing	93	Austin Thom (R)	Unknown	1
Chevrolet	Pedroncelli Racing	33	P. J. Pedroncelli (R)	Unknown	1
Chevrolet	Rodd Racing	68	Rodd Kneeland	Unknown	1
Chevrolet	Steve McGowan Motorsports	17	Tony Toste (R)	Tim Douglas 1 Bruce Cook 2	1
Chevrolet	Steve McGowan Motorsports	17	David Mayhew	Tim Douglas 1 Bruce Cook 2	1
Chevrolet	Steve McGowan Motorsports	17	Zane Smith (R)	Tim Douglas 1 Bruce Cook 2	1
Chevrolet	Zach Telford Racing	17	Zach Telford (R)	Rob Dixon	2
Ford	Bumbera's Performance	72	Kenny Bumbera (R)	Dave Riggs	1
Ford	Chad Bryant Racing	2	Ty Majeski (R)	Paul Andrews	1
Ford	Chad Bryant Racing	22	Corey Heim	Chad Bryant	1
Ford	Jefferson Pitts Racing	1	Jim Inglebright	Unknown	1
Ford	Jefferson Pitts Racing	27	Cole Cabrera (R)	Jerry Pitts	1
Ford	Jefferson Pitts Racing	27	Devin Dodson	Jerry Pitts	2
Ford	Jefferson Pitts Racing	27	Buddy Shepherd	Jerry Pitts	1
Ford	Jefferson Pitts Racing	27	Matt Levin	Jerry Pitts	1
Ford	Jefferson Pitts Racing	55	Trenton Moriarity (R)	Unknown	1
Ford	Sunrise Ford Racing	22	Cole Custer	David McCarty	1
Toyota	Austin Reed Racing	14	Austin Reed (R)	Bond Suss	1
Toyota	Bill McAnally Racing	12	Lawless Alan (R)	Doug George	1
Toyota	Bill McAnally Racing	12	Derrick Doering (R)	Duke Doering	1
Toyota	DGR-Crosley	15	Tanner Gray (R)	Seth Smith	5
Toyota	DGR-Crosley	15	Drew Dollar (R)	Blake Bainbridge	1
Toyota	Hillis Racing	0	Bobby Hillis Jr.	Ed Ash	4
Toyota	Hillis Racing	36	Bobby Hillis Jr.	Unknown	1
Toyota	Kart Idaho Racing	21	Josh Jackson (R)	Pete Trammell	1
Toyota 3 Chevrolet 1	Bill McAnally Racing	50	Dylan Garner (R)	Mike Nascimento 1 R. B. Bracken 2	3
Toyota 3 Chevrolet 1	Bill McAnally Racing	50	Daniel Hemric (R)	Unknown	1
Chevrolet 1 Toyota 1	DeLong Racing	64	David Hibbard (R)	Rich DeLong Jr.	1
Chevrolet 1 Toyota 1	DeLong Racing	64	Nick Joanides	Joe Nava	1
Ford 8 Chevrolet 1	Jefferson Pitts Racing	7	Joey Tanner (R)	Jeff Jefferson 6 Jerry Pitts 3	2
Ford 8 Chevrolet 1	Jefferson Pitts Racing	7	Dustin Ash (R)	Jeff Jefferson 6 Jerry Pitts 3	2
Ford 8 Chevrolet 1	Jefferson Pitts Racing	7	Noah Gragson	Jeff Jefferson 6 Jerry Pitts 3	1
Ford 8 Chevrolet 1	Jefferson Pitts Racing	7	Trenton Moriarity (R)	Jeff Jefferson 6 Jerry Pitts 3	1
Ford 8 Chevrolet 1	Jefferson Pitts Racing	7	Brad Kossow (R)	Jeff Jefferson 6 Jerry Pitts 3	2
Ford 8 Chevrolet 1	Jefferson Pitts Racing	7	Taylor Canfield	Jeff Jefferson 6 Jerry Pitts 3	1
Chevrolet 7 Toyota 1	Levin Racing	10	Matt Levin	Ron Norman	7
Chevrolet 7 Toyota 1	Levin Racing	10	Riley Herbst (Note: Entries were fielded in a collaboration with Joe Gibbs Racing.)	Matt Nethery	1
Chevrolet 4 Ford 1 Toyota 1	Levin Racing	40	Taylor Canfield	Jason Dickenson	1
Chevrolet 4 Ford 1 Toyota 1	Levin Racing	40	Austin Thom (R)	Jason Dickenson	3
Chevrolet 4 Ford 1 Toyota 1	Levin Racing	40	Will Rodgers	Steve Graham	1
Chevrolet 4 Ford 1 Toyota 1	Levin Racing	40	Ty Gibbs (R)	John Nethery	1
Chevrolet 3 Ford 4	Levin Racing	43	Kody Vanderwal	Steve Graham 4 Jason Dickenson 3	7
Ford 2 Chevrolet 1 Toyota 2	Kart Idaho Racing	34	Hollis Thackeray (R) (Note: Between qualifying and the race at Sonoma, Thackeray switched from the No. 38 to the No. 34, taking John Wood's place.)	Unknown 2 Stafford Smith 1 Kevin McCarty 1 Sarah Burgess 1	1
Ford 2 Chevrolet 1 Toyota 2	Kart Idaho Racing	34	Taylor Canfield	Unknown 2 Stafford Smith 1 Kevin McCarty 1 Sarah Burgess 1	1
Ford 2 Chevrolet 1 Toyota 2	Kart Idaho Racing	34	Tony Cosentino (R)	Unknown 2 Stafford Smith 1 Kevin McCarty 1 Sarah Burgess 1	1
Ford 2 Chevrolet 1 Toyota 2	Kart Idaho Racing	34	Bridget Burgess (R)	Unknown 2 Stafford Smith 1 Kevin McCarty 1 Sarah Burgess 1	1
Ford 2 Chevrolet 1 Toyota 2	Kart Idaho Racing	34	Josh Jackson (R)	Unknown 2 Stafford Smith 1 Kevin McCarty 1 Sarah Burgess 1	1
Chevrolet 2 Toyota 1	Kart Idaho Racing	35	Taylor Canfield	Unknown	2
Chevrolet 2 Toyota 1	Kart Idaho Racing	35	Dave Smith	Unknown	1
Ford 4 Chevrolet 5 Toyota 2	Kart Idaho Racing	36	Ron Jay (R)	Sue McCarty 3 Unknown 3 Mike Holleran 1 Darrel Pederson 1 Kevin McCarty 1 Preston Henderson 2	5
Ford 4 Chevrolet 5 Toyota 2	Kart Idaho Racing	36	John Wood	Sue McCarty 3 Unknown 3 Mike Holleran 1 Darrel Pederson 1 Kevin McCarty 1 Preston Henderson 2	1
Ford 4 Chevrolet 5 Toyota 2	Kart Idaho Racing	36	Taylor Canfield	Sue McCarty 3 Unknown 3 Mike Holleran 1 Darrel Pederson 1 Kevin McCarty 1 Preston Henderson 2	1
Ford 4 Chevrolet 5 Toyota 2	Kart Idaho Racing	36	Tony Cosentino (R)	Sue McCarty 3 Unknown 3 Mike Holleran 1 Darrel Pederson 1 Kevin McCarty 1 Preston Henderson 2	1
Ford 4 Chevrolet 5 Toyota 2	Kart Idaho Racing	36	Josh Fanopoulos	Sue McCarty 3 Unknown 3 Mike Holleran 1 Darrel Pederson 1 Kevin McCarty 1 Preston Henderson 2	3
Chevrolet 1 Ford 4	Kart Idaho Racing	37	Keith McGee (R)	Unknown 1 Kevin McCarty 1 Darrel Pederson 1 Stafford Smith 1 Mike Holleran 1	4
Chevrolet 1 Ford 4	Kart Idaho Racing	37	Josh Fanopoulos	Unknown 1 Kevin McCarty 1 Darrel Pederson 1 Stafford Smith 1 Mike Holleran 1	1
Toyota 2 Chevrolet 1	Spurgeon Motorsports	86	Tim Spurgeon	Steve Finsler 1 Mike David 1	2
Toyota 2 Chevrolet 1	Spurgeon Motorsports	86	Bridget Burgess (R)	Sarah Burgess	1
Ford 3 Toyota 4	Velocity Racing	78	Jack Wood (R)	Ty Joiner	6
Ford 3 Toyota 4	Velocity Racing	78	Dylan Caldwell	Tyler Bower	1

== Schedule ==
On January 9, 2019, NASCAR announced the 2019 schedule. Orange Show and the first date at Kern County were dropped from the schedule in favor of Irwindale and Phoenix. All races in the season are televised on NBCSN on a tape delay basis and shown live on FansChoice.tv.

No.	Race title	Track	Location	Date
1	Star Nursery 100	Las Vegas Motor Speedway (Dirt Course)	Las Vegas, Nevada	February 28
2	ENEOS NAPA Auto 150	Irwindale Speedway	Irwindale, California	March 30
3	Port of Tucson Twin 100s	Tucson Speedway	Tucson, Arizona	May 11
4	Port of Tucson Twin 100s	Tucson Speedway	Tucson, Arizona	May 11
5	NAPA Auto Parts 150	Colorado National Speedway	Dacono, Colorado	June 8
6	Procore 200	Sonoma Raceway	Sonoma, California	June 22
7	Clint Newell Auto Group Toyota 150	Douglas County Speedway	Roseburg, Oregon	June 29
8	Casey's General Stores 150 (Note: The Casey's General Stores 150 was held as a combined event, with competitors from the K&N Pro Series West competing along with competitors for the K&N Pro Series East. Drivers received points and statistical credit relative to the whole field in general, instead of relative to other drivers in their series.)	Iowa Speedway	Newton, Iowa	July 26
9	NAPA Auto Parts 150	Evergreen Speedway	Monroe, Washington	August 17
10	Monaco Cocktails Gateway Classic 125 (Note: The Monaco Cocktails Gateway Classic 125 was held as a combined event, with competitors from the K&N Pro Series West competing along with competitors for the K&N Pro Series East. Drivers received points and statistical credit relative to the whole field in general, instead of relative to other drivers in their series.)	Gateway Motorsports Park	Madison, Illinois	August 24
11	NAPA Auto Parts Idaho 208	Meridian Speedway	Meridian, Idaho	September 28
12	NAPA Auto Parts/ENEOS 150	All American Speedway	Roseville, California	October 12
13	NAPA/ENEOS 150 presented by West Coast Stock Car Hall of Fame	Kern County Raceway Park	Bakersfield, California	October 26
14	Arizona Lottery 100	ISM Raceway	Avondale, Arizona	November 9

== Results and standings ==
=== Races ===
No.	Race	Pole position	Most laps led	Winning driver	Manufacturer	No.	Winning team
1	Star Nursery 100	Austin Reed	Derek Kraus	Hailie Deegan	Toyota	19	Bill McAnally Racing
2	ENEOS NAPA Auto 150	Hailie Deegan	Derek Kraus	Trevor Huddleston	Ford	9	Sunrise Ford Racing
3	Port of Tucson Twin 100s	Tanner Gray	Derek Kraus	Derek Kraus	Toyota	16	Bill McAnally Racing
4	Port of Tucson Twin 100s	Brittney Zamora	Derek Kraus	Derek Kraus	Toyota	16	Bill McAnally Racing
5	NAPA Auto Parts 150	Kody Vanderwal	Hailie Deegan	Hailie Deegan	Toyota	19	Bill McAnally Racing
6	Procore 200	Hailie Deegan	Ryan Preece	Noah Gragson	Chevrolet	7	Jefferson Pitts Racing
7	Clint Newell Auto Group Toyota 150	Derek Kraus	Derek Kraus	Derek Kraus	Toyota	16	Bill McAnally Racing
8	Casey's General Stores 150	Sam Mayer	Sam Mayer	Sam Mayer	Chevrolet	21	GMS Racing
9	NAPA Auto Parts 150	Brittney Zamora	Trevor Huddleston	Trevor Huddleston	Ford	9	Sunrise Ford Racing
10	Monaco Cocktails Gateway Classic 125	Chase Cabre	Chase Cabre	Spencer Davis	Ford	30	Rette Jones Racing
11	NAPA Auto Parts Idaho 208	Jagger Jones	Jagger Jones	Derek Kraus	Toyota	16	Bill McAnally Racing
12	NAPA Auto Parts/ENEOS 150	Hailie Deegan	Jagger Jones	Jagger Jones	Ford	6	Sunrise Ford Racing
13	NAPA/ENEOS 150 presented by West Coast Stock Car Hall of Fame	Derek Kraus	Derek Kraus	Derek Kraus	Toyota	16	Bill McAnally Racing
14	Arizona Lottery 100	Sam Mayer	Sam Mayer	Ty Gibbs	Toyota	40	Joe Gibbs Racing with Levin Racing

=== Drivers' championship ===
(key) Bold – Pole position awarded by time. Italics – Pole position set by final practice results or Owners' points. * – Most laps led. ** – All laps led.

Pos.	Driver	LVS	IRW	TUC	TUC	CNS	SON	DCO	IOW	EVG	GTW	MER	AAS	KER	PHO	Points
1	Derek Kraus	6*	3*	1*	1*	8	19	**1****	4	2	2	1	4	**1****	3	591
2	Jagger Jones **(R)**	2	4	4	6	7	12	2	11	5	7	**14***	1*	2	5	542
3	Hailie Deegan	1	**5**	3	15	1*	8	3	12	7	9	13	**2**	3	4	539
4	Trevor Huddleston	7	1	7	4	9	10	4	8	1*	18	3	3	8	8	534
5	Brittney Zamora **(R)**	11	8	5	**3**	4	29	5	20	**3**	16	8	6	4	6	490
6	Todd Souza	5	11	8	16	3	27	7	16	6	10	2	5	5	9	486
7	Travis Milburn	8	13	16	8	14	31	6	15	10	14	7	8	6	14	446
8	Takuma Koga	17	19	15	9	10	17	10	18	16	11	15	13	11	15	420
9	Matt Levin	10	7	6	5	5	14	14							12	279
10	John Wood		QL^{1}	10	DNS^{2}	6	32	9		11	17	18	14			262
11	Kody Vanderwal	4	18	11	12	**2**	15	8								239
12	Taylor Canfield	19				12		15	19	12				12	13	206
13	Tanner Gray **(R)**		2	**2**	2				6		15					195
14	Jack Wood **(R)**		10				16			9			16	13	11	189
15	Ron Jay **(R)**		20	12	13	11	23	12								173
16	Josh Fanopoulos **(R)**								17	13	12	6	15			157
17	Bobby Hillis Jr.			13	14	13				14					19	147
18	Bill Kann		15	17	10		22								22	134
19	Keith McGee **(R)**							11				10	10	Wth	24	121
20	Austin Thom **(R)**		14	14	11		28									109
21	Dylan Garner **(R)**		9										12	7		104
22	Billy Kann			DNS^{2}	DNS^{2}										16	80
23	Tony Cosentino **(R)**									15		16			23	78
24	Rich DeLong III	15	21				18									78
25	Trenton Moriarity **(R)**									4					9	77
26	Brad Kossow **(R)**											5		9		74
27	Dustin Ash **(R)**			9	7											73
28	Joey Tanner **(R)**	3	16													69
29	Zach Telford **(R)**											9		10		69
30	Josh Jackson **(R)**											4	Wth	Wth	17	67
31	Bridget Burgess **(R)**											12	11			65
32	Devin Dodson									8		17				63
33	Tim Spurgeon	18					11									59
34	Ty Gibbs **(R)**								2^{3}						1	48
35	Noah Gragson						1									47
36	Daniel Hemric **(R)**						2									42
37	Sam Mayer **(R)**								**1***^{3}		4^{3}				**2***	42
38	Austin Dillon						3									41
39	Cole Custer						4									40
40	David Mayhew						5									39
41	Cole Cabrera **(R)**		6													38
42	Will Rodgers						6									38
43	Jim Inglebright						7									37
44	Buddy Shepherd												7			37
45	Austin Reed **(R)**	9														36
46	Dave Smith						9									35
47	Derrick Doering **(R)**												9			35
48	Riley Herbst														10	34
49	Dylan Caldwell **(R)**											11				33
50	Kenny Bumbera **(R)**	12														32
51	Armani Williams **(R)**		12													32
52	Rob Powers **(R)**	13														31
53	Paul Pedroncelli Jr. **(R)**						13									31
54	James Cooley							13								31
55	David Hibbard **(R)**	14														30
56	Tony Toste **(R)**	16														28
57	Nick Joanides		17													27
58	Drew Dollar **(R)**							7^{3}							18	26
59	Ryan Preece **(R)**						20*									26
60	Ty Majeski **(R)**														20	24
61	Carlos Vieira						21									23
62	Zane Smith **(R)**														21	23
63	Lawless Alan						24									20
64	Rodd Kneeland						25									19
65	Corey Heim														25	19
66	Dale Quarterley						26									18
67	Hollis Thackeray						30									14
Drivers ineligible for K&N Pro Series West points
	Spencer Davis								9		1					
	Rubén García Jr.								3		6					
	David Gilliland										3					
	Chase Cabre								5		**13***					
	Parker Retzlaff										5					
	Colin Garrett								13		8					
	Max McLaughlin **(R)**								10		19					
	Brandon Oakley								14							
	Jett Noland **(R)**								Wth							
Pos.	Driver	LVS	IRW	TUC	TUC	CNS	SON	DCO	IOW	EVG	GTW	MER	AAS	KER	PHO	Points

Notes

- ^{1} – John Wood qualified in the No. 38 for Armani Williams.
- ^{2} – Billy Kann and John Wood received championship points, despite the fact that they did not start the race.
- ^{3} – Scored points towards the K&N Pro Series East.

== See also ==
- 2019 Monster Energy NASCAR Cup Series
- 2019 NASCAR Xfinity Series
- 2019 NASCAR Gander Outdoors Truck Series
- 2019 ARCA Menards Series
- 2019 NASCAR K&N Pro Series East
- 2019 NASCAR Whelen Modified Tour
- 2019 NASCAR Pinty's Series
- 2019 NASCAR PEAK Mexico Series
- 2019 NASCAR Whelen Euro Series
- 2019 CARS Tour
