= Taylor Canfield (racing driver) =

American racing driver

- Born: February 25, 1989 (age 37); El Cajon, California, U.S.

ARCA Menards Series West career
- 10 races run over 2 years
- Best finish: 12th (2019)
- First race: 2018 NAPA Auto Parts Idaho 208 (Meridian)
- Last race: 2019 Arizona Lottery 100 (Phoenix)
Wins	Top tens	Poles
0	1	0
- Statistics up to date as of February 3, 2025.

Taylor Canfield (born February 25, 1989) is an American former professional stock car racing driver who has competed in the NASCAR K&N Pro Series West from 2018 to 2019.

== Motorsports results ==
=== NASCAR ===
(key) (Bold - Pole position awarded by qualifying time. Italics - Pole position earned by points standings or practice time. * – Most laps led.)

==== K&N Pro Series West ====
NASCAR K&N Pro Series West results
Year	Team	No.	Make	1	2	3	4	5	6	7	8	9	10	11	12	13	14	NKNPSWC	Pts	Ref
2018	Kart Idaho Racing	32	Toyota	KCR	TUS	TUS	OSS	CNS	SON	DCS	IOW	EVG	GTW	LVS	MER; 12			22nd	98	
2018	Kart Idaho Racing	39	Toyota													AAS; 8		22nd	98	
2018	Kart Idaho Racing	36	Toyota														KCR; 14	22nd	98	
2019	Levin Racing	40	Chevy	LVS; 19	IRW	TUS	TUS											12th	206	
2019	Kart Idaho Racing	35	Chevy					CNS; 12	SON	DCS; 15								12th	206	
2019	Kart Idaho Racing	36	Chevy								IOW; 19							12th	206	
2019	Kart Idaho Racing	34	Chevy									EVG; 12	GTW	MER	AAS			12th	206	
2019	Kart Idaho Racing	38	Chevy													KCR; 12		12th	206	
2019	Jefferson Pitts Racing	7	Ford														PHO; 13	12th	206	
