= 2021 Arizona Lottery 100 =

Race details
- Race 9 of 9 in the 2021 ARCA Menards Series West season
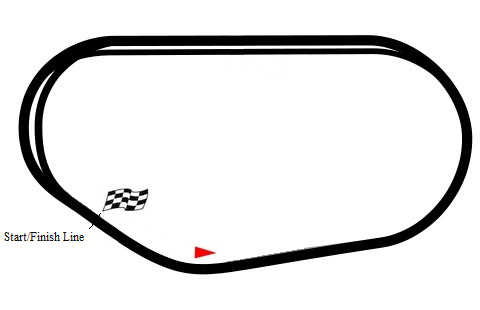
- Date: November 6, 2021
- Location: Phoenix Raceway in Avondale, Arizona
- Course: Permanent racing facility
- Course length: 1.61 km (1.00 miles)
- Distance: 100 laps, 100.00 mi (160.93 km)
- Average speed: 85.531 miles per hour (137.649 km/h)

Pole position
Driver	Ty Gibbs	Joe Gibbs Racing
- Time: 26.654

Most laps led
Driver	Ty Gibbs	Joe Gibbs Racing
- Laps: 100

Winner
No. 18	Ty Gibbs	Joe Gibbs Racing

The 2021 Arizona Lottery 100 was a ARCA Menards Series West race held on November 6, 2021. It was contested over 100 laps on the 1.00-mile (1.61 km) oval. It was the ninth and final race of the 2021 ARCA Menards Series West season. Joe Gibbs Racing driver Ty Gibbs won his second race of the season. Jesse Love clinched the 2021 ARCA Menards Series West championship in a tie-breaker with Jake Drew.

== Background ==
=== Entry list ===
- (R) denotes rookie driver.
- (i) denotes driver who is ineligible for series driver points.

No.	Driver	Team	Manufacturer
2	Nick Sanchez	Rev Racing	Chevrolet
4	Eric Nascimento	Bill McAnally Racing	Toyota
6	Trevor Huddleston	Sunrise Ford Racing	Ford
7	Takuma Koga	Jerry Pitts Racing	Toyota
8	Johnny Borneman III	Borneman Motorsports	Ford
9	Jake Drew	Sunrise Ford Racing	Ford
13	Todd Souza	Central Coast Racing	Ford
15	Drew Dollar	Venturini Motorsports	Toyota
16	Jesse Love	Bill McAnally Racing	Toyota
17	Conner Jones	Steve McGowan Motorsports	Chevrolet
18	Ty Gibbs	Joe Gibbs Racing	Toyota
19	Sebastian Arias	Bill McAnally Racing	Toyota
20	Gracie Trotter	Venturini Motorsports	Toyota
21	Josh Fanolpoulos	Kart Idaho Racing	Ford
22	Daniel Dye	GMS Racing	Chevrolet
25	Parker Chase	Venturini Motorsports	Toyota
27	Bobby Hillis Jr.	Hillis Racing	Chevrolet
30	Max Gutierrez	Rette Jones Racing	Ford
31	Paul Pedroncelli	Pedroncelli Racing	Chevrolet
33	P.J. Pedroncelli	Pedroncelli Racing	Toyota
45	Jake Garcia	David Gilliland Racing	Ford
46	J. P. Bergeron	David Gilliland Racing	Ford
51	Dean Thompson	High Point Racing	Ford
54	Joey Iest	David Gilliland Racing	Ford
55	Toni Breidinger	Venutrini Motorsports	Toyota
66	Rajah Caruth	Rev Racing	Chevrolet
71	Taylor Gray	David Gilliland Racing	Ford
77	Ryan Roulette	Performance P-1 Motorsports	Toyota
78	Travis Milburn	Kart Idaho Racing	Toyota
80	Brian Kamisky	Brian Kamisky Racing	Toyota
81	Sammy Smith	Joe Gibbs Racing	Toyota
88	Bridget Burgess	BMI Racing	Chevrolet
99	Cole Moore	Bill McAnally Racing	Toyota
08	Caleb Costner	Kart Idaho Racing	Ford
Official entry list

== Practice/Qualifying ==
Practice and qualifying were combined into 1 90-minute session, where the fastest lap counted as the driver's qualifying lap. Ty Gibbs collected the pole with a time of 26.654 and a speed of 135.064 mph (217.364 km/h).

=== Starting Lineups ===
Pos	No	Driver	Team	Manufacturer	Time
1	18	Ty Gibbs	Joe Gibbs Racing	Toyota	26.654
2	81	Sammy Smith	Joe Gibbs Racing	Toyota	26.794
3	71	Taylor Gray	David Gilliland Racing	Ford	26.843
4	45	Jake Garcia	David Gilliland Racing	Ford	27.262
5	22	Daniel Dye	GMS Racing	Chevrolet	27.264
6	46	J. P. Bergeron	David Gilliland Racing	Ford	27.278
7	15	Drew Dollar	Venturini Motorsports	Toyota	27.305
8	66	Rajah Caruth	Rev Racing	Chevrolet	27.369
9	2	Nick Sanchez	Rev Racing	Chevrolet	27.445
10	20	Gracie Trotter	Venturini Motorsports	Toyota	27.62
11	25	Parker Chase	Venturini Motorsports	Toyota	27.672
12	30	Max Gutierrez	Rette Jones Racing	Ford	27.802
13	6	Trevor Huddleston	Sunrise Ford Racing	Ford	27.895
14	33	P. J. Pedroncelli	Pedroncelli Racing	Chevrolet	27.917
15	16	Jesse Love	Bill McAnally Racing	Toyota	27.919
16	55	Toni Breidinger	Venturini Motorsports	Toyota	27.972
17	9	Jake Drew	Sunrise Ford Racing	Ford	27.995
18	17	Conner Jones	Steve McGowan Motorsports	Chevrolet	28.038
19	51	Dean Thompson	High Point Racing	Ford	28.043
20	99	Cole Moore	Bill McAnally Racing	Toyota	28.108
21	54	Joey Iest	David Gilliland Racing	Ford	28.121
22	4	Eric Nascimento	Bill McAnally Racing	Toyota	28.267
23	13	Todd Souza	Central Coast Racing	Toyota	28.744
24	8	Johnny Borneman III	Borneman Motorsports	Ford	29.013
25	7	Takuma Koga	Jerry Pitts Racing	Toyota	29.021
26	88	Bridget Burgess	BMI Racing	Chevrolet	29.152
27	78	Travis Milburn	Kart Idaho Racing	Toyota	29.234
28	80	Brian Kamisky	Brian Kamisky Racing	Chevrolet	29.259
29	21	Josh Fanopoulos	Kart Idaho Racing	Toyota	29.827
30	19	Sebastian Arias	Bill McAnally Racing	Toyota	30.042
31	77	Ryan Roulette	Performance P-1 Motorsports	Toyota	30.407
32	8	Caleb Costner	Kart Idaho Racing	Ford	30.472
33	27	Bobby Hillis Jr.	Hillis Racing	Chevrolet	30.869
34	31	Paul Pedroncelli	Pedroncelli Racing	Chevrolet	34.216
Official qualifying results

== Race ==
=== Race results ===
Pos	Grid	No	Driver	Team	Manufacturer	Laps	Points	Status
1	1	18	Ty Gibbs	Joe Gibbs Racing	Toyota	100	49	Running
2	3	71	Taylor Gray	David Gilliland Racing	Ford	100	42	Running
3	2	81	Sammy Smith	Joe Gibbs Racing	Toyota	100	41	Running
4	9	2	Nick Sanchez	Rev Racing	Chevrolet	100	40	Running
5	6	46	J. P. Bergeon	David Gilliland Racing	Ford	100	39	Running
6	4	45	Jake Garcia	David Gilliland Racing	Ford	100	38	Running
7	7	15	Drew Dollar	Venturini Motorsports	Toyota	100	37	Toyota
8	8	66	Rajah Caruth	Rev Racing	Chevrolet	100	36	Running
9	10	20	Gracie Trotter	Venturini Motorsports	Toyota	100	35	Running
10	20	99	Cole Moore	Bill McAnally Racing	Toyota	100	34	Running
11	17	9	Jake Drew	Sunrise Ford Racing	Ford	100	33	Running
12	5	22	Daniel Dye	GMS Racing	Chevrolet	100	32	Running
13	11	25	Parker Chase	Venturini Motorsports	Toyota	100	31	Running
14	15	16	Jesse Love	Bill McAnally Racing	Toyota	100	30	Running
15	13	6	Trevor Huddleston	Sunrise Ford Racing	Ford	100	29	Running
16	23	13	Todd Souza	Central Coast Racing	Chevrolet	99	28	Running
17	21	54	Joey Iest	David Gilliland Racing	Ford	99	27	Running
18	14	33	P. J. Pedroncelli	Pedroncelli Racing	Chevrolet	99	26	Running
19	18	17	Conner Jones	Steve McGowan Motorsports	Chevrolet	99	25	Running
20	24	8	Johnny Borneman III	Borneman Motorsports	Ford	99	24	Running
21	12	30	Max Gutierrez	Rette Jones Racing	Ford	98	23	Running
22	19	51	Dean Thompson	High Point Racing	Ford	98	22	Running
23	25	7	Takuma Koga	Jerry Pitts Racing	Toyota	98	21	Running
24	26	88	Bridget Burgess	BMI Racing	Chevrolet	98	20	Running
25	28	20	Brian Kamisky	Brian Kamisky Racing	Toyota	97	19	Running
26	30	19	Sebastian Arias	Bill McAnally Racing	Toyota	94	18	Running
27	16	55	Toni Breidinger	Venturini Motorsports	Toyota	92	17	Running
28	32	77	Ryan Roulette	Performance P-1 Motorsports	Toyota	91	16	Running
29	31	27	Bobby Hillis Jr.	Hillis Racing	Chevrolet	90	15	Running
30	34	08	Caleb Costner	Kart Idaho Racing	Toyota	86	14	Running
31	29	21	Josh Fanopoulos	Kart Idaho Racing	Toyota	77	13	Crash
32	22	4	Eric Nascimento	Bill McAnally Racing	Toyota	65	12	Crash
33	27	78	Travis Milburn	Kart Idaho Racing	Toyota	43	11	Transmission
34	33	31	Paul Pedroncelli	Pedroncelli Racing	Chevrolet	2	10	Brakes

Previous race: 2021 NAPA Auto Care 150	ARCA Menards Series West; 2021 season	Next race: --
