= Austin Reed (racing driver) =

American racing driver (born 1993)

- Born: September 17, 1993 (age 33); Bakersfield, California, U.S.

ARCA Menards Series East career
- 1 race run over 1 year
- Best finish: 39th (2019)
- First race: 2019 Bush's Beans 150 (Bristol)
Wins	Top tens	Poles
0	0	0

ARCA Menards Series West career
- 6 races run over 5 years
- Best finish: 36th (2020)
- First race: 2014 NAPA Auto Parts / Toyota 150 (Evergreen)
- Last race: 2020 Star Nursery 150 (LVMS Bullring)
Wins	Top tens	Poles
0	3	0
- Statistics up to date as of November 2, 2025.

Austin Reed (born September 17, 1993) is an American professional stock car racing driver who has competed in the NASCAR K&N Pro Series East and the ARCA Menards Series West.

Reed has also previously competed in series such as the SRL Spears Southwest Tour, the Northwest Super Late Model Series, the PASS Pro Late Model Series, and the SRL Legends Tour.

== Motorsports results ==
=== NASCAR ===
(key) (Bold – Pole position awarded by qualifying time. Italics – Pole position earned by points standings or practice time. * – Most laps led.)

==== K&N Pro Series East ====
NASCAR K&N Pro Series East results
Year	Team	No.	Make	1	2	3	4	5	6	7	8	9	10	11	12	NKNPSEC	Pts	Ref
2019	Dave Reed	14	Toyota	NSM	BRI	SBO	SBO	MEM	NHA	IOW	GLN	BRI; 12	GTW	NHA	DOV	39th	32	

=== ARCA Menards Series West ===
ARCA Menards Series West results
Year	Team	No.	Make	1	2	3	4	5	6	7	8	9	10	11	12	13	14	AMSWC	Pts	Ref
2014	Dave Reed	44	Toyota	PHO	IRW	S99	IOW	KCR	SON	SLS	CNS	IOW	EVG; 10	KCR	MMP	AAS	PHO; 16	39th	62	
2015	Dave Reed	44	Toyota	KCR	IRW	TUS	IOW	SHA	SON	SLS	IOW	EVG	CNS	MER	AAS	PHO; 20		66th	24	
2018	Dave Reed	44	Toyota	KCR	TUS	TUS	OSS	CNS	SON	DCS	IOW	EVG	GTW	LVS; 11	MER	AAS	KCR	43rd	33	
2019	Dave Reed	14	Toyota	LVS; 9	IRW	TUS	TUS	CNS	SON	DCS	IOW	EVG	GTW	MER	AAS	KCR	PHO	45th	36	
2020	Jerry Pitts Racing	7	Ford	LVS; 9	MMP	MMP	IRW	EVG	DCS	CNS	LVS	AAS	KCR	PHO				36th	35	
