= Travis Milburn =

American racing driver (born 1992)

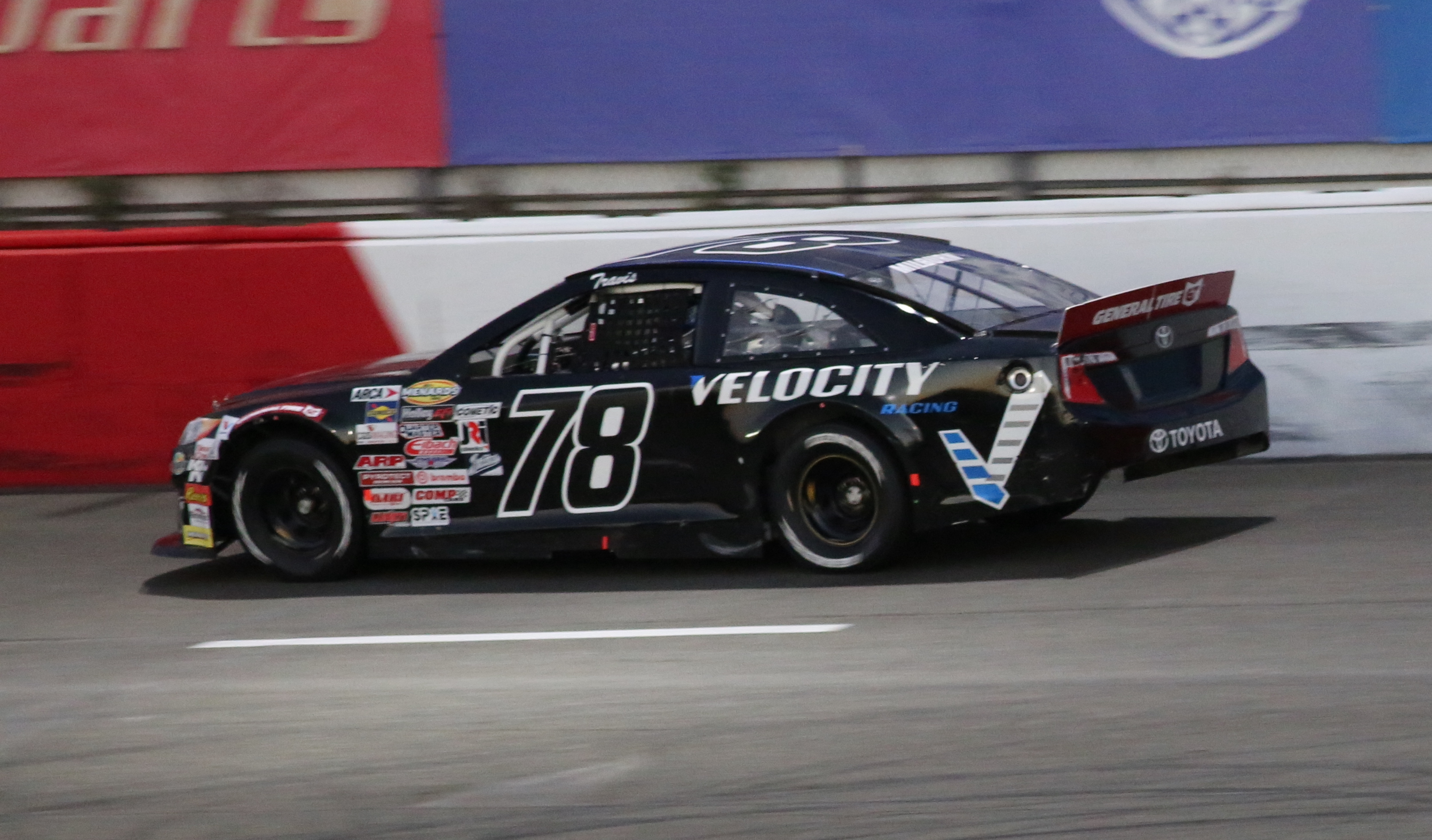
- Milburn's No. 78 car at All American Speedway in 2021
- Born: May 13, 1992 (age 34); Eagle, Idaho, U.S.

ARCA Menards Series East career
- 5 races run over 3 years
- Best finish: 16th (2019)
- First race: 2019 WhosYourDriver.org Twin 100s#1 (South Boston)
- Last race: 2019 Monaco Cocktails Gateway Classic 125 (Gateway)
Wins	Top tens	Poles
0	2	0

ARCA Menards Series West career
- 67 races run over 10 years
- Best finish: 7th (2019)
- First race: 2008 NASCAR Camping World Series 125 (Tooele)
- Last race: 2021 Arizona Lottery 100 (Phoenix)
Wins	Top tens	Poles
0	16	0
- Statistics up to date as of April 21, 2023.

Travis Milburn (born May 13, 1992) is an American professional stock car racing driver who has competed in the NASCAR K&N Pro Series East and ARCA Menards Series West.

== Racing career ==
In 2008, Milburn made his debut in the NASCAR Camping World West Series at Miller Motorsports Park, driving the No. 83 Ford for James Wood, where he finished 28th after suffering a timing chain failure before he completed a lap. He then made another start that year at All American Speedway, where he finished five laps down in fifteenth. In 2009, Milburn ran four races that year, this time driving the No. 14 Ford, where he achieved a best finish of sixth at Colorado National Speedway.

In 2010, Milburn ran the full West Series schedule, this time driving for Bob Wood, where he finished tenth in the points after earning three top-ten finishes with a best finish of seventh in the season opening race at Roseville. He then attempted all but two races of the schedule, primarily driving for Bob Wood, and attempting the Iowa Speedway event with Mike Naake. He earned one top-ten finish at Spokane County Raceway and finished fifteenth in the final points standings. In 2012, Miburn ran solely for Bob Wood, running ten races and getting a best finish of seventh at Roseville. He then attempted six more races for Bob Wood in 2013, before driving the No. 30 for Adan Alvarado. Afterwards, he left the West Series to compete in both the SRL Spears Southwest Tour Series and the Pacific Challenge Series, finishing sixth in the points in the latter series in 2017.

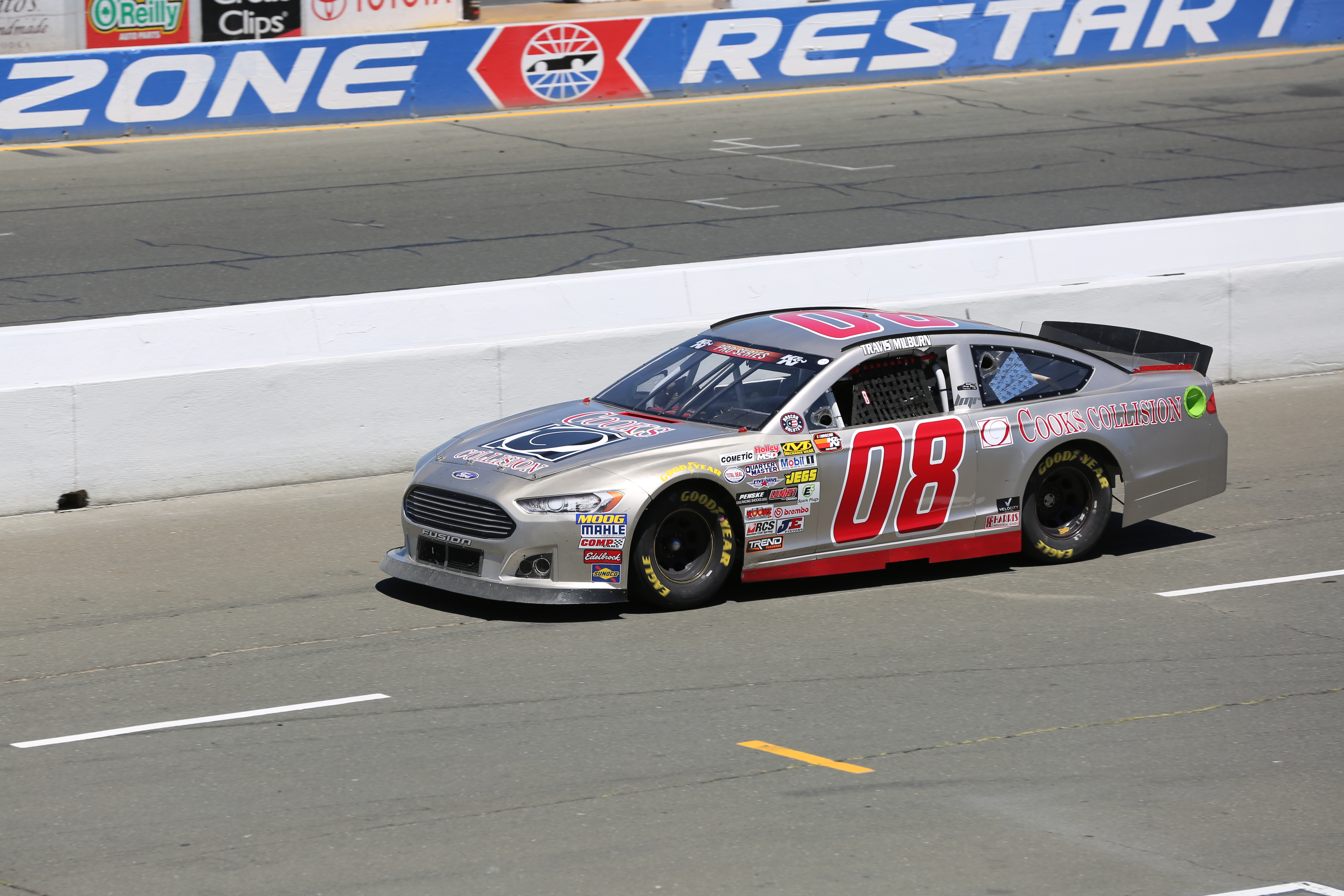
Milburn's No. 08 car at Sonoma Raceway in 2018

In 2018, Milburn returned to the West Series, this time driving select races for Kart Idaho Racing in the No. 08 Chevrolet, where he achieved a best finish of fifth at Roseville. He then ran full time with the team the following year, where he achieved seven top-ten finishes with a best result of sixth at Douglas County Speedway, and finished seventh in the final points standings. It was also during this year that he made select starts in the NASCAR K&N Pro Series East for Kart Idaho Racing, getting two top-ten finishes at South Boston Speedway. In 2020, he was originally entered in the season-opening race at the Las Vegas Motor Speedway Bullring with Kart Idaho Racing, but he and the team withdrew from the event.

In 2021, Milburn made two starts for Velocity Racing and the No. 78 Toyota, finishing twentieth at Roseville due to a crash, and 33rd at Phoenix Raceway due to transmission issues.

== Personal life ==
Miburn was born and raised in Eagle, Idaho. He serves as a driver coach for Kart Idaho Racing, as well as a track promoter for Blue Valor Motorplex.

== Motorsports results ==
=== NASCAR ===
(key) (Bold – Pole position awarded by qualifying time. Italics – Pole position earned by points standings or practice time. * – Most laps led.)

==== K&N Pro Series East ====
NASCAR K&N Pro Series East results
Year	Team	No.	Make	1	2	3	4	5	6	7	8	9	10	11	12	NKNPSEC	Pts	Ref
2010	Bob Wood	14	Chevy	GRE	SBO	IOW; DNQ	MAR	NHA	LRP	LEE	JFC	NHA	DOV			N/A	0	
2011	Mike Naake	88	Toyota	GRE	SBO	RCH	IOW; DNQ	BGS	JFC	LGY	NHA	COL	GRE	NHA	DOV	N/A	0	
2019	Kart Idaho Racing	08	Chevy	NSM	BRI	SBO; 7	SBO; 9	MEM	NHA	IOW; 15			GTW; 14	NHA	DOV	16th	158	
2019	Kart Idaho Racing	08	Ford								GLN; 17	BRI				16th	158	

=== ARCA Menards Series West ===
(key) (Bold – Pole position awarded by qualifying time. Italics – Pole position earned by points standings or practice time. * – Most laps led.)

ARCA Menards Series West results
Year	Team	No.	Make	1	2	3	4	5	6	7	8	9	10	11	12	13	14	15	AMSWC	Pts	Ref
2008	James Wood	83	Ford	AAS	PHO	CTS	IOW	CNS	SON	IRW	DCS	EVG	MMP; 28	IRW	AMP	AAS; 14			42nd	200	
2009	James Wood	14	Ford	CTS	AAS	PHO	MAD	IOW	DCS	SON	IRW; 20	PIR; 19	MMP; 26	CNS; 6	IOW	AAS			27th	449	
2010	Bob Wood	14	Chevy	AAS; 7	PHO; 18	IOW; DNQ	DCS; 14	SON; 16			MRP; 16	CNS; 12		AAS; 11					10th	1412	
2010	Bob Wood	14	Toyota						IRW; 30						PHO; 21				10th	1412	
2010	Bob Wood	14	Ford							PIR; 8			MMP; 10						10th	1412	
2011	Bob Wood	14	Toyota	PHO; 35						IRW; 20	EVG; 14				SPO; 10	AAS; 14	PHO; 39		15th	1147	
2011	Bob Wood	14	Ford		AAS; 11	MMP; 27			SON; 31			PIR; 27	CNS	MRP					15th	1147	
2011	Mike Naake	88	Toyota				IOW; DNQ												15th	1147	
2011	Bob Wood	14	Chevy					LVS; 17											15th	1147	
2012	Bob Wood	14	Toyota	PHO; 14			S99; 15	IOW	BIR									PHO; 23	15th	272	
2012	Bob Wood	14	Chevy		LHC; 19					LVS; 16			CNS; 13	IOW			AAS; 7		15th	272	
2012	Bob Wood	14	Ford			MMP; 26					SON; 11	EVG			PIR; 25	SMP			15th	272	
2013	Bob Wood	14	Toyota	PHO; 20	S99; 22	BIR	IOW	L44	SON; 6	CNS; 11	IOW	EVG	SPO; 8	MMP; 18	SMP				15th	235	
2013	Adan Alvarado	30	Toyota													AAS; 16			15th	235	
2013	Adan Alvarado	30	Chevy														KCR; 16	PHO	15th	235	
2018	Kart Idaho Racing	08	Chevy	KCR; 15	TUS	TUS	OSS	CNS	SON; 21	DCS	IOW	EVG	GTW	LVS	MER; 13	AAS; 5	KCR; 17		16th	149	
2019	Kart Idaho Racing	08	Ford	LVS; 8					SON; 31										7th	446	
2019	Kart Idaho Racing	08	Chevy		IRW; 13	TUS; 16	TUS; 8	CNS; 14		DCS; 6	IOW; 15	EVG; 10	GTW; 14	MER; 7	AAS; 8	KCR; 6	PHO; 14		7th	446	
2020	Kart Idaho Racing	08	Chevy	LVS; Wth	MMP	MMP	IRW	EVG	DCS	CNS	LVS	AAS	KCR	PHO					N/A	0	
2021	Velocity Racing	78	Toyota	PHO	SON	IRW	CNS	IRW	PIR	LVS	AAS; 20	PHO; 33							50th	24	
