= Gracie Trotter =

American racing driver

- Born: Gracie Elizabeth Trotter; August 27, 2001 (age 25); Denver, North Carolina, U.S.

ARCA Menards Series career
- 12 races run over 2 years
- Best finish: 11th (2021)
- First race: 2020 General Tire 150 (Phoenix)
- Last race: 2021 Sioux Chief PowerPEX 200 (Salem)
Wins	Top tens	Poles
0	6	0

ARCA Menards Series East career
- 2 races run over 2 years
- Best finish: 42nd (2021)
- First race: 2020 Skip's Western Outfitters 175 (New Smyrna)
- Last race: 2021 Sprecher 150 (Milwaukee)
Wins	Top tens	Poles
0	1	0

ARCA Menards Series West career
- 13 races run over 2 years
- Best finish: 3rd (2020)
- First race: 2020 Star Nursery 150 (Las Vegas)
- Last race: 2021 Arizona Lottery 100 (Phoenix)
- First win: 2020 General Tire 150 (Las Vegas)
Wins	Top tens	Poles
1	12	0
- Statistics up to date as of January 24, 2025.

Gracie Elizabeth Trotter (born August 27, 2001) is an American stock car racing driver. She last competed part-time in the ARCA Menards Series, driving the Nos. 15 and 25 Toyota Camrys for Venturini Motorsports. Trotter also competes for Rev Racing in the NASCAR Advance Auto Parts Weekly Series as part of NASCAR's Drive for Diversity program. She is best known for becoming the first female driver to win an ARCA-sanctioned race, doing so in the ARCA Menards Series West for Bill McAnally Racing in 2020.

== Racing career ==
=== Early career ===
Trotter began racing go-karts at eight years old. Before racing stock cars, she competed in legends cars, becoming the first female driver to win in the Young Lions division at Charlotte Motor Speedway in 2017. Trotter also made her late model debut in 2017, driving for Bond Suss. She continued racing in the CARS Tour in 2018.

In October 2018, Trotter was selected as one of twelve drivers invited to NASCAR's Drive for Diversity combine. She was announced as a member of the program's 2019 class on December 6, earning her a late model contract with Rev Racing to compete in the NASCAR Whelen All-American Series. Trotter was selected to the program again in 2020.

=== ARCA ===
Trotter racing at New Smyrna Speedway in 2020

On January 14, 2020, Trotter was announced as a driver for Bill McAnally Racing (BMR) in the ARCA Menards Series West, as well as for select ARCA Menards Series and ARCA Menards Series East races. Trotter finished 16th in her debut ARCA East race at New Smyrna Speedway, while engine issues left her 22nd in her ARCA Menards Series debut at Phoenix Raceway. In ARCA West, Trotter finished fourth in her debut race at the Las Vegas Motor Speedway (LVMS) Bullring, before the COVID-19 pandemic put the season on hold. She returned from the hiatus with a pair of seventh-place finishes, followed by a career-best third at Irwindale Speedway. At Douglas County Speedway, Trotter again earned a new career-best finish, placing second to race winner Blaine Perkins.

In September, Trotter won a late model race at Hickory Motor Speedway, becoming the fourth woman to do so. She then won her first ARCA West race on September 26 at the LVMS Bullring, making her the second female driver to win a West Series race and the first to win an event sanctioned by ARCA. Trotter passed Blaine Perkins and her BMR teammate Jesse Love by taking them three-wide on lap 54, going on to lead 95 of the race's 150 laps. Trotter's season ended with a ninth-place finish at Phoenix. She finished third in the final points standings and was the only West Series driver to finish in the top-ten in all eleven races throughout the season. Trotter was awarded the Wendell Scott Trailblazer Award on December 3.

On January 13, 2021, Venturini Motorsports announced that Trotter would compete part-time for the team in the 2021 ARCA Menards Series, driving the team's No. 15 and No. 25 Toyotas in a total of ten races.

== Motorsports career results ==
=== Racing career summary ===
Season	Series	Team	Races	Wins	Top 5	Top 10	Points	Position
2017	CARS Super Late Model Tour	Bond Suss	1	0	0	1	25	39th
2018	CARS Super Late Model Tour	Tracy Trotter	3	0	0	2	63	19th
2019	CARS Super Late Model Tour	Tracy Trotter	1	0	0	0	18	42nd
2020	ARCA Menards Series West	Bill McAnally Racing	11	1	7	11	582	**3rd**
2020	ARCA Menards Series East	Bill McAnally Racing	1	0	0	0	28	45th
2020	ARCA Menards Series	Bill McAnally Racing	3	0	0	1	89	37th
2021	ARCA Menards Series West	Venturini Motorsports	2	0	0	1	52	33rd
2021	ARCA Menards Series East	Venturini Motorsports	1	0	0	1	34	42nd
2021	ARCA Menards Series	Venturini Motorsports	9	0	2	5	279	11th

=== ARCA Menards Series ===
(key) (Bold – Pole position awarded by qualifying time. Italics – Pole position earned by points standings or practice time. * – Most laps led.)

ARCA Menards Series results
Year	Team	No.	Make	1	2	3	4	5	6	7	8	9	10	11	12	13	14	15	16	17	18	19	20	AMSC	Pts	Ref
2020	Bill McAnally Racing	99	Toyota	DAY	PHO; 22	TAL	POC	IRP	KEN	IOW; 9	KAN	TOL	TOL	MCH	DAY	GTW; 12	L44	TOL	BRI	WIN	MEM	ISF	KAN	37th	89	
2021	Venturini Motorsports	25	Toyota	DAY; 23	PHO; 27	TAL; 22	KAN	TOL; 7	CLT	MOH	POC	ELK; 3	BLN; 8	IOW	WIN	GLN	MCH; 13	ISF	MLW; 10	DSF	BRI	SLM; 5	KAN	11th	279	

==== ARCA Menards Series East ====
ARCA Menards Series East results
Year	Team	No.	Make	1	2	3	4	5	6	7	8	AMSEC	Pts	Ref
2020	Bill McAnally Racing	99	Toyota	NSM; 16	TOL	DOV	TOL	BRI	FIF			45th	28	
2021	Venturini Motorsports	25	Toyota	NSM	FIF	NSV	DOV	SNM	IOW	MLW; 10	BRI	42nd	34	

==== ARCA Menards Series West ====
ARCA Menards Series West results
Year	Team	No.	Make	1	2	3	4	5	6	7	8	9	10	11	AMSW	Pts	Ref
2020	Bill McAnally Racing	99	Toyota	LVS; 4	MMP; 7	MMP; 7	IRW; 3	EVG; 5	DCS; 2	CNS; 4	LVS; 1*	AAS; 10	KCR; 5	PHO; 9	3rd	582	
2021	Venturini Motorsports	25	Toyota	PHO; 27	SON	IRW	CNS	IRW	PIR	LVS	AAS				33rd	52	
2021	Venturini Motorsports	20	Toyota									PHO; 9			33rd	52	

=== CARS Super Late Model Tour ===
(key)

CARS Super Late Model Tour results
Year	Team	No.	Make	1	2	3	4	5	6	7	8	9	10	11	12	13	CSLMTC	Pts	Ref
2017	Bond Suss	55	Toyota	CON	DOM	DOM	HCY	HCY	BRI	AND	ROU; 8	TCM	ROU	HCY	CON	SBO	39th	25	
2018	Tracy Trotter	2T	Toyota	MYB	NSH	ROU; 10	HCY	BRI	AND	HCY; 16	ROU; 10	SBO					19th	63	
2019	Tracy Trotter	2T	Toyota	SNM; 15	HCY	NSH	MMS	BRI	HCY	ROU	SBO						42nd	18	
