= Matt Levin =

American racecar driver

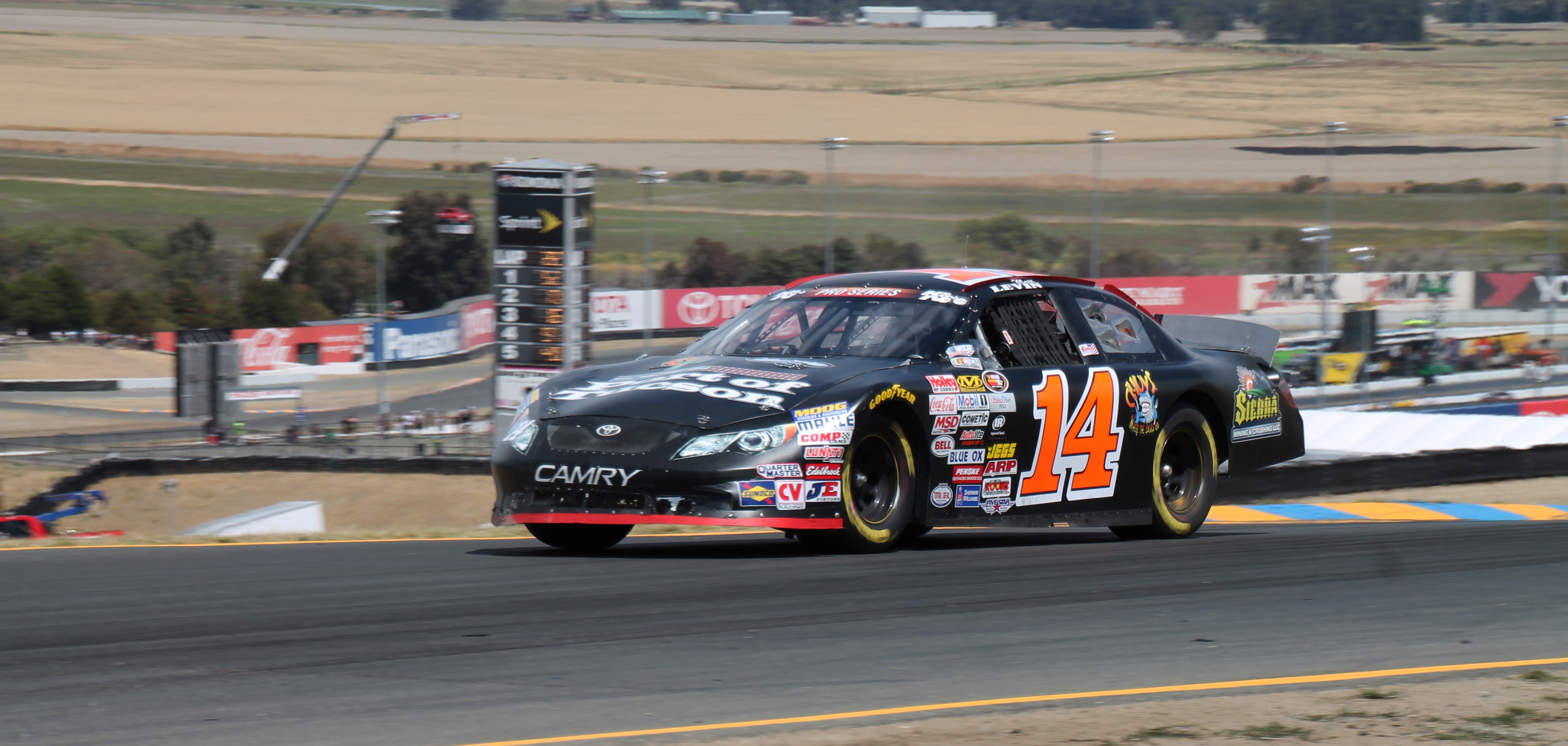
- Levin racing in the 2015 Carneros 200 at Sonoma Raceway
- Nationality: (United States) American
- Born: January 8, 1975 (age 51) Tucson, Arizona, U.S.

NASCAR K&N Pro Series West career
- Debut season: 2015
- Current team: Norman Levin Racing
- Car number: 10
- Crew chief: Erik Higley
- Starts: 56
- Wins: 0
- Poles: 0
- Best finish: 8th in 2018
- Finished last season: 8th

Previous series
- 2014: NASCAR Whelen All-American Series
- Statistics up to date as of November 11, 2019.

Matt Levin (born January 8, 1975) is an American former professional stock car racing driver. He last competed part-time in the NASCAR K&N Pro Series West, driving the No. 10 Chevrolet SS for Levin Racing.

== Racing career ==
Levin debuted in the K&N Pro Series West in March 2015 at Kern County Raceway Park.

During the NAPA Auto Parts 150 at Kern County in April 2016, Levin was involved in a spectacular accident just as they were taking a late restart. After Blaine Perkins got spun by Julia Landauer, Levin spun her out in reaction and then while trying to get away, made contact with Perkins and tipped over onto his roof. He climbed from the wreckage without injury.

In 2019, Levin scored his first career top-five finish at his home track in Tucson.

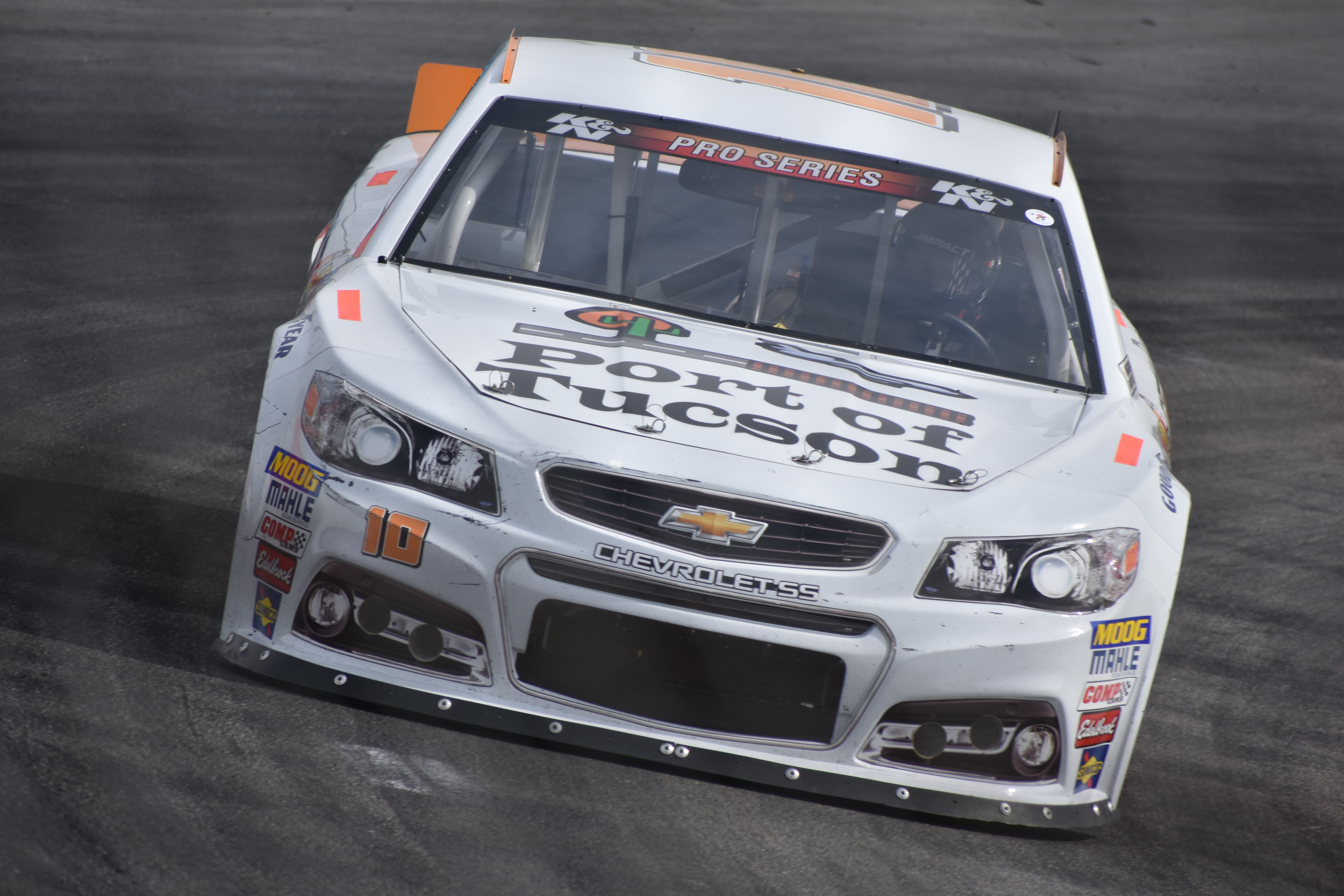
Levin making practice laps at Meridian Speedway in 2018.

== Personal life ==
Levin is from Tucson, Arizona.

== Motorsports career results ==
=== NASCAR ===
(key) (Bold – Pole position awarded by qualifying time. Italics – Pole position earned by points standings or practice time. * – Most laps led.)

==== K&N Pro Series East ====
NASCAR K&N Pro Series East results
Year	Team	No.	Make	1	2	3	4	5	6	7	8	9	10	11	12	13	14	NKNPSEC	Pts	Ref
2018	Levin Racing	10	Chevy	NSM; 20														30th	69	
2018	Levin Racing	10	Ford		BRI; 25	LGY	SBO	SBO	MEM	NJM	THO	NHA	IOW; 18	GLN	GTW	NHA	DOV	30th	69	

==== K&N Pro Series West ====
NASCAR K&N Pro Series West results
Year	Team	No.	Make	1	2	3	4	5	6	7	8	9	10	11	12	13	14	NKNPSWC	Pts	Ref
2015	Norman Levin Racing	14	Toyota	KCR; 17	IRW; 19	TUS; 11	IOW; 12	SHA; 17	SON; 25	SLS; 14								11th	372	
2015	Norman Levin Racing	14	Ford								IOW; 10	EVG; 10	CNS; 14	MER; 12	AAS; 16	PHO; 23		11th	372	
2016	Norman Levin Racing	14	Ford	IRW; 19	KCR; 17	TUS; 6	OSS; 8	CNS; 8	SON; 14	SLS; 9	IOW; 14	EVG	DCS	MMP	MMP	MER	AAS	14th	258	
2017	Norman Levin Racing	10	Chevy	TUS; 13	KCR; 15	IRW; 9	IRW; 12	SPO; 11	OSS; 9	CNS; 11	SON; 14	IOW; 19	EVG; 7	DCS; 10	MER; 21	AAS; 12	KCR; 25	11th	428	
2018	Levin Racing	10	Chevy	KCR; 11	TUS; 12	TUS; 12	OSS; 10	CNS; 8	SON; 26	DCS; 9		EVG; 8	GTW	LVS; 9	MER; 7	AAS; 6	KCR; 10	8th	426	
2018	Levin Racing	10	Ford								IOW; 18							8th	426	
2019	Levin Racing	10	Chevy	LVS; 10	IRW; 7	TUS; 6	TUS; 5	CNS; 5	SON; 12	DCS; 14	IOW	EVG	GTW	MER	AAS	KCR		9th	279	
2019	JP Racing	27	Ford														PHO; 12	9th	279	
