= Bobby Hillis Jr. =

American racing driver (born 1961)

- Hillis Jr. during driver intros at Phoenix Raceway in 2021.
- Born: Robert Hillis Jr. September 10, 1961 (age 65); Phoenix, Arizona

NASCAR FedEx Freight Truck Series career
- 2 races run over 2 years
- 2002 position: N/A
- Best finish: 64th (2000)
- First race: 2000 Line-X 225 (Portland)
- Last race: 2000 Grainger.com 200 (Pikes Peak)
Wins	Top tens	Poles
0	0	0

ARCA Menards Series career
- 5 races run over 5 years
- Best finish: 111th (2023)
- First race: 2021 General Tire 150 (Phoenix)
- Last race: 2026 General Tire 150 (Phoenix)
Wins	Top tens	Poles
0	0	0

ARCA Menards Series West career
- 106 races run over 21 years
- Best finish: 8th (2020)
- First race: 2001 NASCAR Winter Heat (Phoenix)
- Last race: 2026 Portland 112 (Portland)
Wins	Top tens	Poles
0	8	0
- Statistics up to date as of August 8, 2026.

Robert Hillis Jr. (born September 10, 1961) is an American professional stock car racing driver. He has been a longtime competitor in NASCAR's West Series, currently known as the ARCA Menards Series West. For the vast majority of his starts, he has driven for his team, Hillis Racing, also sometimes known as Fierce Creature Racing. Hillis made two starts in the NASCAR Craftsman Truck Series in 2000 as well.

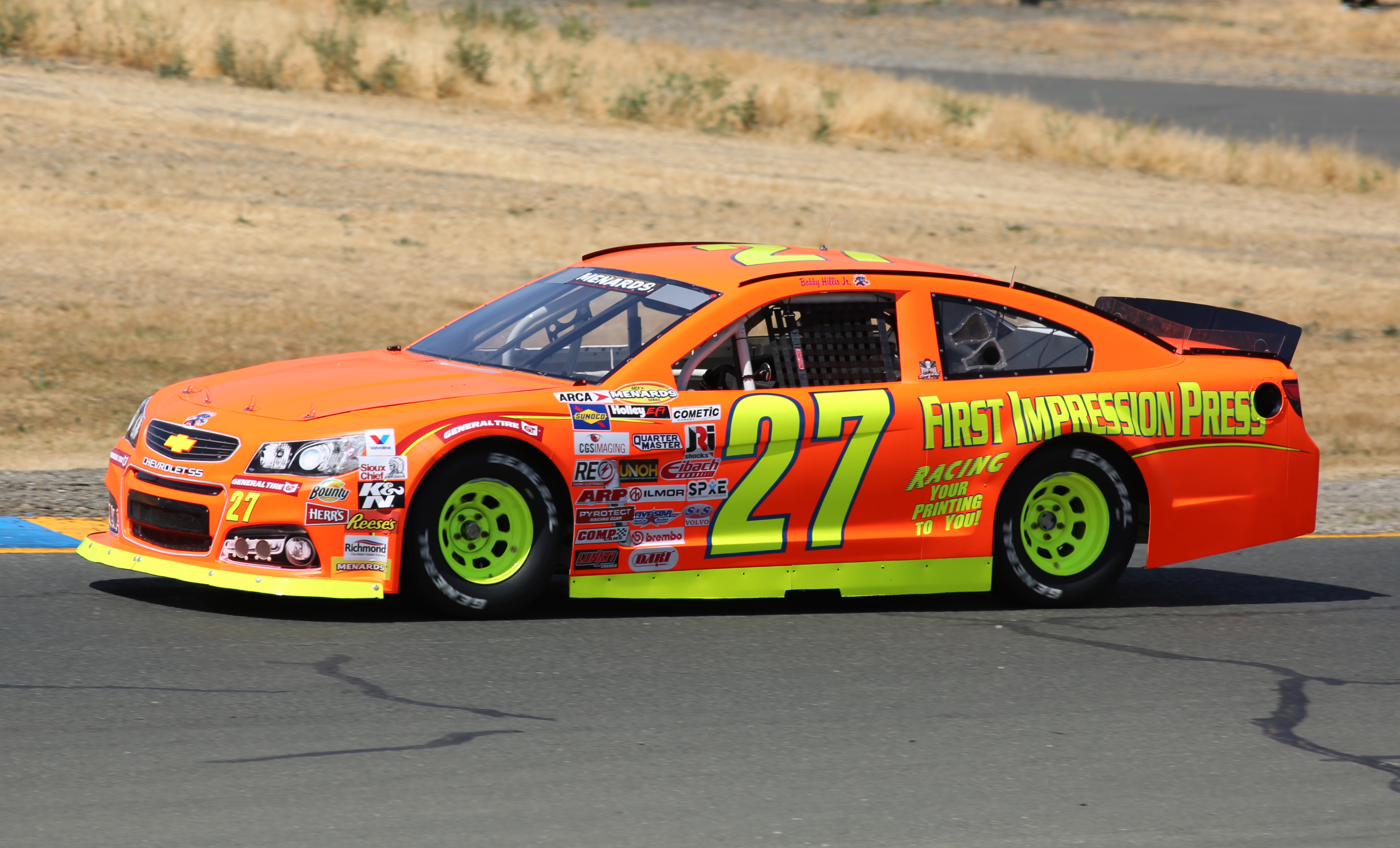
Hillis Jr. competing at Sonoma Raceway in 2021.

== Personal life ==
When Hillis uses the No. 0, he puts a small-sized less than symbol to the left of the number to symbolize that his team is underfunded and has a budget that looks like it is less than zero. Also, in races where he drives a Toyota Camry, he tends to cover up the word "Camry" on the nose to say "Kamree", which is the name of his daughter.

== Motorsports career results ==
=== NASCAR ===
(key) (Bold – Pole position awarded by qualifying time. Italics – Pole position earned by points standings or practice time. * – Most laps led.)

==== Craftsman Truck Series ====
NASCAR Craftsman Truck Series results
Year	Team	No.	Make	1	2	3	4	5	6	7	8	9	10	11	12	13	14	15	16	17	18	19	20	21	22	23	24	NCTC	Pts	Ref
2000	Fierce Creature Racing	05	Chevy	DAY	HOM	PHO; DNQ	MMR	MAR	PIR; 31	GTY	MEM	PPR; 34	EVG; DNQ	TEX	KEN	GLN	MLW	NHA	NZH	MCH	IRP; DNQ	NSV	CIC	RCH	DOV	TEX	CAL	64th	266	
2002	Fierce Creature Racing	05	Chevy	DAY	DAR	MAR	GTY	PPR	DOV	TEX	MEM	MLW	KAN	KEN	NHA	MCH	IRP	NSH	RCH	TEX	SBO	LVS	CAL; DNQ	PHO; DNQ	HOM			N/A	0	

=== ARCA Menards Series ===
(key) (Bold – Pole position awarded by qualifying time. Italics – Pole position earned by points standings or practice time. * – Most laps led.)

ARCA Menards Series results
Year	Team	No.	Make	1	2	3	4	5	6	7	8	9	10	11	12	13	14	15	16	17	18	19	20	AMSC	Pts	Ref
2021	Hillis Racing	27W	Chevy	DAY	PHO; 24	TAL	KAN	TOL	CLT	MOH	POC	ELK	BLN	IOW	WIN	GLN	MCH	ISF	MLW	DSF	BRI	SLM	KAN	112th	20	
2022	Fierce Creature Racing	27	Chevy	DAY	PHO; 26	TAL	KAN	CLT	IOW	BLN	ELK	MOH	POC	IRP	MCH	GLN	ISF	MLW	DSF	KAN	BRI	SLM	TOL	118th	18	
2023	Fierce Creature Racing	27	Chevy	DAY	PHO; 25	TAL	KAN	CLT	BLN	ELK	MOH	IOW	POC	MCH	IRP	GLN	ISF	MLW	DSF	KAN	BRI	SLM	TOL	111th	19	
2024	Fierce Creature Racing	27	Chevy	DAY	PHO; 36	TAL	DOV	KAN	CLT	IOW	MOH	BLN	IRP	SLM	ELK	MCH	ISF	MLW	DSF	GLN	BRI	KAN	TOL	119th	8	
2026	Fierce Creature Racing	06	Chevy	DAY	PHO; 38	KAN	TAL	GLN	TOL	MCH	POC	BER	ELK	CHI	LRP	IRP	IOW	ISF	MAD	DSF	SLM	BRI	KAN	137th	6	

==== ARCA Menards Series West ====
ARCA Menards Series West results
Year	Team	No.	Make	1	2	3	4	5	6	7	8	9	10	11	12	13	14	15	AMSWC	Pts	Ref
2001	Fierce Creature Racing	27	Chevy	PHO; 19	LVS	TUS	MMR; DNQ	CAL	IRW	LAG	KAN	EVG	CNS	IRW; 16	RMR; 10	LVS; 28	IRW		26th	507	
2002	Fierce Creature Racing	27	Chevy	PHO; 17	LVS; 12		KAN; 12	EVG; 13	IRW; 18	S99; 16	RMR; 19	DCS; 16	LVS; 21						11th	1147	
2002	Fierce Creature Racing	27	Pontiac			CAL; 17													11th	1147	
2003	Fierce Creature Racing	27	Chevy	PHO; 26	LVS; 20	CAL; 26	MAD; 14	TCR; 17	EVG; 17	IRW; 21	S99; 14	RMR; 19	DCS; 16	PHO; 19	MMR; 22				12th	1263	
2004	Fierce Creature Racing	27	Chevy	PHO; 25	MMR; 19	CAL; 17	S99; 18	EVG; 23	IRW; 22	S99; 11	RMR; 17	DCS; 18	PHO; 11	CNS; 19	MMR; DNQ	IRW; 23			15th	1375	
2005	Fierce Creature Racing	27	Chevy	PHO; 33	MMR	PHO; 30	S99	IRW; 27	EVG	S99	PPR; 20	CAL; 19	DCS	CTS	MMR				25th	428	
2006	Fierce Creature Racing	27	Chevy	PHO; 33										CTS; 19	AMP; 22				17th	1152	
2006	Sellers Racing	15	Pontiac		PHO; 28	S99; 22	IRW; 18	SON; 34											17th	1152	
2006	Fierce Creature Racing	27	Ford						DCS; 14	IRW; 14	EVG; 15	S99; 16	CAL; 33						17th	1152	
2007	Melanie Carter	27	Chevy	CTS; 16	PHO; 29	AMP; 22	ELK	IOW	CNS	SON	DCS	IRW	MMP	EVG	CSR	AMP			36th	288	
2008	Melanie Carter	27	Ford	AAS	PHO; 19	CTS	IOW	CNS	SON	IRW	DCS	EVG	MMP	IRW	AMP	AAS			63rd	106	
2010	Hillis Racing	27	Ford	AAS	PHO; 30	IOW	DCS	SON	IRW	PIR	MRP	CNS	MMP	AAS	PHO				76th	73	
2012	Hillis Racing	27	Dodge	PHO; DNQ	LHC	MMP	S99	IOW	BIR	LVS	SON								64th	32	
2012	Aer Krebs	55	Dodge									EVG; 23	CNS	IOW	PIR	SMP	AAS	PHO	64th	32	
2013	Hillis Racing	27	Dodge	PHO; DNQ	S99	BIR	IOW	L44	SON	CNS	IOW	EVG	SPO	MMP	SMP	AAS	KCR	PHO	N/A	0	
2015	Ralph Byers	0	Chevy	KCR; 24	IRW; 23	TUS; 22	IOW	SHA	SON	SLS	IOW	EVG	CNS	MER	AAS	PHO; DNQ			32nd	71	
2017	Hillis Racing	0	Chevy	TUS; 23	KCR	IRW	IRW	SPO	OSS	CNS	SON	IOW	EVG	DCS	MER	AAS	KCR		59th	21	
2019	Hillis Racing	0	Toyota	LVS	IRW	TUS; 13	TUS; 14	CNS; 13	SON	DCS	IOW	EVG; 14	GTW	MER	AAS	KCR			17th	147	
2019	Hillis Racing	36	Toyota														PHO; 19		17th	147	
2020	Hillis Racing	0	Toyota	LVS; 13															8th	499	
2020	Hillis Racing	27	Chevy		MMP; 10	MMP; 13	IRW; 16	EVG; 10			LVS; 8	AAS; 13	KCR; 11	PHO; 20					8th	499	
2020	Hillis Racing	27	Toyota						DCS; 10	CNS; 11									8th	499	
2021	Hillis Racing	27W	Chevy	PHO; 24															10th	346	
2021	Hillis Racing	27	Chevy		SON; 10	IRW; 10		IRW; 12	PIR; 15	LVS; 15		PHO; 29							10th	346	
2021	Hillis Racing	27	Toyota				CNS; 17				AAS; 18								10th	346	
2022	Fierce Creature Racing	27	Chevy	PHO; 26	IRW	KCR	PIR	SON	IRW	EVG	PIR	AAS	LVS	PHO; 22					35th	90	
2023	Fierce Creature Racing	27	Chevy	PHO; 25	IRW; 9	KCR; 12	PIR	SON; Wth	IRW	SHA	EVG	AAS	LVS; 20	MAD	PHO; 28				19th	126	
2024	Fierce Creature Racing	27	Chevy	PHO; 36	KCR; 17	PIR; 15	SON; 28	IRW; 16	IRW; 19	SHA	TRI	MAD	AAS	KER	PHO; 23				16th	204	
2025	Fierce Creature Racing	27	Chevy	KER	PHO	TUC	CNS	KER	SON	TRI	PIR; 18	AAS	MAD	LVS	PHO				68th	26	
2026	Fierce Creature Racing	06	Chevy	KER	PHO; 38														58th	36	
2026	Fierce Creature Racing	27	Chevy			TUC; Wth	SHA	CNS	TRI	SON; Wth	PIR; 14	AAS	MAD	LVS	PHO	KER			58th	36	

^{*} Season still in progress
