= Tucson Speedway =

Racetrack in Arizona, US

- Location: 11955 S Harrison Rd, Tucson, AZ 85747
- Coordinates: 32°2′15″N 110°47′20″W
- Owner: John Lashley (2013–present); Mark Ebert (2008–2012); Dan & Joyce Ruth (2005–2008] Deery Sports West, Inc. (2002–2005); International Speedway Corporation (1982–2002)
- Operator: Shelly McGriff
- Broke ground: 1967
- Opened: 1968
- Former names: Tucson Raceway Park (1990–2012); Raven Raceway (1987–1989); Corona Speedway (1968–1986)
- Major events: Current: ARCA Menards Series West; West Series races at Tucson (1974, 1993–1999, 2001, 2015–2019, 2025–present); NASCAR Advance Auto Parts Weekly Series; Chilly Willy 150 (2014–present); Former: NASCAR Craftsman Truck Series; NAPA 200 (1995–1997); NASCAR Southwest Series (1993–2001, 2003–2004)

Paved Oval (1987–present)
- Length: 0.604 km (0.375 mi)
- Banking: 3° – 9° Variable Banking
- Race lap record: 0:16.353 ( (United States) Trevor Huddleston, Ford Fusion NASCAR, 2025, ARCA Menards)

Tucson Speedway is a 0.375 mi (0.604 km) paved oval racetrack located at the Pima County Fairgrounds, off Interstate 10 just south of Tucson, Arizona. It is one of only three paved ovals in the state of Arizona (the others are Phoenix Raceway and Havasu 95 Speedway).

== History ==
The track was built in 1967 as the Corona Speedway. The original track layout was a dirt/clay half mile oval, with an infield quarter mile track that connected via the frontstraightaway. T.A.S.C.A. would operate the track until 1981, when internal issues would arise in T.A.S.C.A. Bob Frakes would take over as the operator until passing the torch to Calvin Renard in 1983. The track would close in the winter of 1983 before B.O.P. Incorporated would take the lease and operate the track until 1986.

In 1987, dirt racer Dan Manes and his wife Linda would take over the track, reconfiguring it into a 0.375 mi (0.604 km) oval and renaming the facility "Raven Raceway". One change brought by the Manes was the addition of the NASCAR Winston Racing Series program to the track, which is still part of the weekly program as of 2024.

In 1990, a subsidiary of International Speedway Corporation, Great Western Sports, would purchase the lease and take over from the Manes family, also renaming the track for a second time as "Tucson Raceway Park". the In this time, Brian France would take over track operations. In late 1992, the track was paved to an asphalt surface.

One major change during the ISC era of Tucson Raceway Park, was the addition of NASCAR Winter Heat. From Winter of 1994 to Winter of 1999, Winter Heat would nationally televise races held at the track first on TNN Sports before switching over to ESPN2 by the end of the decade. Winter Heat would feature NASCAR Winston Weekly Series late models, the NASCAR Featherlite Southwest Tour, and the NASCAR Winston West Series. The NASCAR Craftsman Truck Series would also make an appearance at the inaugural Winter Heat in 1994/1995, running several exhibition races prior to the series' debut at Phoenix in January of 1995.

After over a decade of operation, ISC sold TRP's lease to David Derry and Deery Sports West, Inc. in February 2002.

In 2005, the track was sold to Dan and Joyce Ruth, who made many track improvements. Three years later, Ruth sold the track to Mark Ebert, who made it an ASA Member track.

In 2012, Tucson businessman John Lashley bought the lease on the track and spent six months renovating the facility, which included a change back to asphalt. It re-opened in 2013 as Tucson Speedway. In 2014 Tucson Speedway joined NASCAR as an authorized Hometrack. 2014 would also be the year that introduced the track's biggest race the Chilly Willy 150.

== Chilly Willy 150 ==
Since 2014 the Chilly Willy 150 has become the marquee event at the Tucson Speedway. The race debuted on February 8th, 2014 as a 100 lap (37.5 Mile) race. Las Vegas native Dustin Ash would take home $2,000 in the inaugural Chilly Willy, in a race that featured a total of 16 starters.

As of 2024, the Chilly Willy has grown to become a major super late model event on the West Coast. The race kicks off the NASCAR Advance Auto Parts Weekly Series and currently pays $15,000 to the winner of the race. The race typically sees over 30 entries, with the record being 40 entries in 2019.

Year	Driver
2014	Dustin Ash
2015	Tayler Riddle
2016	Chuck Wares
2017	Owen Riddle
2018	Chris Eggleston
2019	Michael Scott
2020	Preston Peltier
2021	Christian McGhee
2022	Preston Peltier (2)
2023	Preston Peltier (3)
2024	Kole Raz

== Former events ==
=== ARCA Menards Series West ===
The Tucson Speedway hosted the ARCA Menards Series West in various stretches from 1974 to 2019. The inaugural race was held in May of 1974, as the fifth round of the NASCAR Winston West Series. Ray Elder would win the Corona 100, beating 23 other competitors on the then half mile dirt track in a 100 lap (50 mile) event. The series wouldn't make their return until nearly two decades later, on June 12th, 1993 with a 200 lap (75 miles) event with Dirk Stephens reigning victorious over the field of 18 cars, including Tucson's Paul Banghart.

Starting in 1995, the track would see the then NASCAR Winston West Series twice a year, once in the spring and once in the winter as a part of Winter Heat. The race distance at Tucson would stay at 200 laps (75 miles) with the exception of Winter Heat 1996 & 1997 when the race would be run as a 150 lap (56 mile) race.

After the end of Winter Heat, the series would return as a 250 lap (95 miles) race for a one off event in March of 2001, which would be won by Johnny Borneman III.

The series would make its return 14 years later in 2015, as an annual 150 lap race before changing over to a twin 100 lap race format for 2018 and 2019. The track will return to the West series schedule in 2025.
