= 2020 Arizona Lottery 100 =

Eleventh race of the 2020 ARCA Menards Series West

Race details
- Race 11 of 11 in the 2020 ARCA Menards Series West season
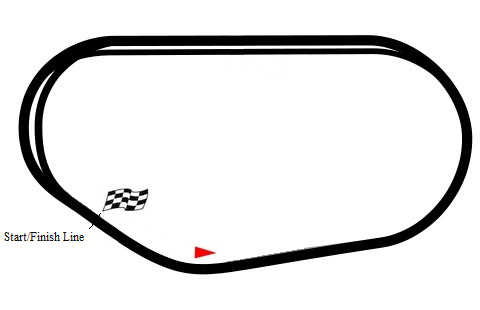
- Location: Phoenix Raceway in Avondale, Arizona
- Course: Permanent racing facility
- Course length: 1.00 miles (1.61 km)
- Distance: 100 laps, 100.00 mi (160.93 km)
- Average speed: 83.779 miles per hour (134.829 km/h)

Pole position
Driver	David Gilliland	DGR-Crosley
- Time: 27.452

Most laps led
Driver	Ty Gibbs	Joe Gibbs Racing
- Laps: 77

Winner
No. 4	David Gilliland	DGR-Crosley

Television in the United States
- Network: NBCSN
- Announcers: Charles Krall

Radio in the United States
- Radio: MRN

The 2020 Arizona Lottery 100 was the 11th and final stock car race of the 2020 ARCA Menards Series West season, and the 48th iteration of the event. The race was held on Saturday, November 7, 2020, at Phoenix Raceway in Avondale, Arizona, a 1-mile (1.6 km) permanent tri-oval shaped racetrack. The race took the scheduled 100 laps to complete. David Gilliland won the race in his only start of the season, driving for his own team. Jesse Love would officially be the champion, beating Blaine Perkins by 25 points. This would make Love the youngest champion in NASCAR history.

== Background ==
Phoenix Raceway – also known as PIR – is a one-mile, low-banked tri-oval race track located in Avondale, Arizona. It is named after the nearby metropolitan area of Phoenix. The motorsport track opened in 1964 and currently hosts two NASCAR race weekends annually. PIR has also hosted the IndyCar Series, CART, USAC and the Rolex Sports Car Series. The raceway is currently owned and operated by International Speedway Corporation.

The raceway was originally constructed with a 2.5 mi (4.0 km) road course that ran both inside and outside of the main tri-oval. In 1991 the track was reconfigured with the current 1.51 mi (2.43 km) interior layout. PIR has an estimated grandstand seating capacity of around 67,000. Lights were installed around the track in 2004 following the addition of a second annual NASCAR race weekend.

Phoenix Raceway is home to two annual NASCAR race weekends, one of 13 facilities on the NASCAR schedule to host more than one race weekend a year. The track is both the first and last stop in the western United States, as well as the fourth and the last track on the schedule.

=== Entry list ===
- (R) denotes rookie driver.

No.	Driver	Team	Manufacturer
4	David Gilliland	DGR-Crosley	Ford
6	Trevor Huddleston	Sunrise Ford Racing	Ford
7	Devin Dodson	JP Racing	Ford
9	Blaine Perkins	Sunrise Ford Racing	Ford
10	Cody Erickson	Fast Track Racing	Chevrolet
12	Chris Hacker	Fast Track Racing	Toyota
12w	Alex Sedgwick	Bill McAnally Racing	Toyota
13	Todd Souza	Central Coast Racing	Toyota
15	Drew Dollar	Venturini Motorsports	Toyota
16	Gio Scelzi (R)	Bill McAnally Racing	Toyota
17	Taylor Gray	DGR-Crosley	Ford
17W	Zane Smith	Steve McGowan Motorsports	Chevrolet
18	Ty Gibbs	Joe Gibbs	Toyota
19	Jesse Love (R)	Bill McAnally Racing	Toyota
20	Corey Heim	Venturini Motorsports	Toyota
21	Sam Mayer	GMS Racing	Chevrolet
22	Kris Wright	Chad Bryant Racing	Ford
25	Keith Rocco	Venturini Motorsports	Toyota
27	Bobby Hillis Jr.	Hillis Racing	Chevrolet
30	Justin Lofton	Rette Jones Racing	Ford
32	Howie DiSavino III	Win-Tron Racing	Chevrolet
54	Todd Gilliland	DGR-Crosley	Ford
54w	Joey Iest	Naake-Klauer Motorsports	Toyota
77	Takuma Koga	Performance P-1 Motorsports	Toyota
78	Jack Wood	Velocity Racing	Toyota
88	Bridget Burgess	BMI Racing	Toyota
99	Gracie Trotter (R)	Bill McAnally Racing	Toyota

== Qualifying ==
Qualifying was held on Saturday, November 7. The qualifying system used is a single-car, single-lap system with only one round. Whoever sets the fastest time in that round will win the pole. David Gilliland, driving for DGR-Crosley, would score the pole for the race, with a lap of 27.452 seconds, and an average speed of 131.138 mph (211.046 km/h).

Pos.	#	Driver	Team	Make	Time	Speed
1	4	David Gilliland	DGR-Crosley	Ford	27.452	131.138
2	21	Sam Mayer	GMS Racing	Chevrolet	27.481	131.000
3	18	Ty Gibbs	Joe Gibbs Racing	Toyota	27.486	130.976
4	20	Corey Heim	Venturini Motorsports	Toyota	27.592	130.473
5	17	Taylor Gray	DGR-Crosley	Ford	27.758	129.692

== Race results ==
Fin	St	#	Driver	Team	Make	Laps	Led	Status	Pts
1	1	4	David Gilliland	DGR-Crosley	Ford	100	23	Running	48
2	3	18	Ty Gibbs	Joe Gibbs Racing	Toyota	100	77	Running	43
3	7	17	Taylor Gray	DGR-Crosley	Ford	100	0	Running	41
4	6	54	Todd Gilliland	DGR-Crosley	Ford	100	0	Running	40
5	9	15	Drew Dollar	Venturini Motorsports	Toyota	100	0	Running	39
6	10	30	Justin Lofton	Rette Jones Racing	Ford	100	0	Running	38
7	11	6	Trevor Huddleston	Sunrise Ford Racing	Ford	100	0	Running	37
8	4	20	Corey Heim	Venturini Motorsports	Toyota	100	0	Running	36
9	15	99	Gracie Trotter (R)	Bill McAnally Racing	Toyota	100	0	Running	35
10	14	25	Keith Rocco	Venturini Motorsports	Toyota	100	0	Running	34
11	17	32	Howie DiSavino III	Win-Tron Racing	Chevrolet	100	0	Running	33
12	16	54w	Joey Iest	Naake-Klauer Motorsports	Toyota	100	0	Running	32
13	20	12w	Alex Sedgwick	Bill McAnally Racing	Toyota	99	0	Running	31
14	13	19	Jesse Love (R)	Bill McAnally Racing	Toyota	99	0	Running	30
15	24	12	Chris Hacker	Fast Track Racing	Toyota	98	0	Running	29
16	21	7	Devin Dodson	JP Racing	Ford	98	0	Running	28
17	22	13	Todd Souza	Central Coast Racing	Toyota	97	0	Running	27
18	12	22	Kris Wright	Chad Bryant Racing	Chevrolet	96	0	Running	26
19	27	10	Cody Erickson	Fast Track Racing	Chevrolet	95	0	Running	25
20	26	27	Bobby Hillis Jr.	Hillis Racing	Chevrolet	95	0	Running	24
21	2	21	Sam Mayer	GMS Racing	Chevrolet	92	0	Accident	23
22	25	88	Bridget Burgess	BMI Racing	Toyota	91	0	Running	22
23	23	77	Takuma Koga	Performance P-1 Motorsports	Toyota	78	0	Running	21
24	8	78	Jack Wood	Velocity Racing	Toyota	72	0	Accident	20
25	18	9	Blaine Perkins	Sunrise Ford Racing	Ford	67	0	Engine	19
26	5	17w	Zane Smith	Steve McGowan Motorsports	Chevrolet	22	0	Accident	18
27	19	16	Gio Schelzi (R)	Bill McAnally Racing	Toyota	1	0	Accident	17

== Standings after the race ==
Pos	Driver	Points
1	Jesse Love	513
2	Blaine Perkins	488 (-25)
3	Gracie Trotter	482 (-31)
4	Trevor Huddleston	472 (-41)
5	Gio Scelzi	460 (-53)
6	Todd Souza	450 (-63)
7	Takuma Koga	409 (-104)
8	Bobby Hillis Jr.	399 (-114)
9	Holley Hollan	398 (-115)
10	Bridget Burgess	283 (-230)

- Note: Only the first 10 positions are included for the driver standings.

Previous race: 2020 NAPA/ENEOS 125 presented by West Coast Stock Car Hall of Fame	ARCA Menards Series West; 2020 season	Next race: 2021 General Tire 150
