= Cody Erickson =

American racing driver

- Born: Cody E. Erickson; September 22, 1988 (age 38); Ulen, Minnesota, U.S.

NASCAR FedEx Freight Truck Series career
- 5 races run over 4 years
- 2021 position: 61st
- Best finish: 61st (2021)
- First race: 2014 Kroger 200 (Martinsville)
- Last race: 2021 Corn Belt 150 (Knoxville)
Wins	Top tens	Poles
0	0	0

ARCA Menards Series career
- 1 race run over 1 year
- Best finish: 96th (2014)
- First race: 2014 Federated Car Care ARCA Fall Classic presented by JayC Food Stores (Salem)
Wins	Top tens	Poles
0	0	0

ARCA Menards Series West career
- 1 race run over 1 year
- Best finish: 39th (2020)
- First race: 2020 Arizona Lottery 100 (Phoenix)
Wins	Top tens	Poles
0	0	0
- Statistics up to date as of January 24, 2025.

Cody E. Erickson (born September 22, 1988) is an American professional stock car racing driver. He last competed part-time in the NASCAR Camping World Truck Series, driving the No. 41 Chevrolet Silverado for Cram Racing Enterprises.

== Career ==
A dirt, ATV, and snowmobile driver for at least ten years prior to 2014, Erickson attempted to qualify for the NASCAR Camping World Truck Series race at the dirt track of Eldora that same year, driving the No. 82 for Empire Racing. He came up just short of making the race after not finishing well enough in the last-chance qualifier. After he failed to make the field, the team invited him back for a pavement start at Martinsville that October, which he did qualify for, finishing 23rd in the race.

Empire put Erickson in their ARCA Racing Series No. 82 car at Salem in September of that year, which was his debut in the series. He finished in the top-15 in his first ARCA start.

Erickson returned to Eldora to try to qualify for the race there again in 2015, driving a second truck for Empire due to Sean Corr being in the No. 82 that Erickson had driven the prior year. The second truck for the team used the No. 35 with leased owner points from Win-Tron Racing. Empire did this instead of fielding a separate truck of their own so Erickson could have a better chance of qualifying (which he successfully did). He went on to finish 25th in the race.

On September 15, 2020, it was announced that Erickson would return to the now-Gander RV & Outdoors Truck Series for the first time in five years, driving the No. 41 Cram Racing Enterprises Chevrolet at Bristol. He would later drive the No. 01 Chevrolet for Fast Track Racing in the 2020 ARCA Menards Series West finale, where he finished 19th. Erickson returned to the No. 41 truck team for the new dirt race at Bristol in 2021.

== Personal life ==
Erickson works as a farmer, an owner of two businesses, and an owner-driver of a dirt racing team in his hometown of Ulen, Minnesota. He graduated from both the University of Northwestern Ohio with a degree in High Performance and Chassis Fabrication, and Northland Technical College (in Minnesota) with a degree in Farm Business Management.

== Motorsports career results ==
=== NASCAR ===
(key) (Bold – Pole position awarded by qualifying time. Italics – Pole position earned by points standings or practice time. * – Most laps led.)

==== Camping World Truck Series ====
NASCAR Camping World Truck Series results
Year	Team	No.	Make	1	2	3	4	5	6	7	8	9	10	11	12	13	14	15	16	17	18	19	20	21	22	23	NCWTC	Pts	Ref
2014	Empire Racing	82	Chevy	DAY	MAR	KAN	CLT	DOV	TEX	GTW	KEN	IOW	ELD; DNQ	POC	MCH	BRI	MSP	CHI	NHA	LVS	TAL						73rd	21	
2014	Empire Racing	82	Ford																			MAR; 23	TEX	PHO	HOM		73rd	21	
2015	Empire Racing	35	Chevy	DAY	ATL	MAR	KAN	CLT	DOV	TEX	GTW	IOW	KEN	ELD; 25	POC	MCH	BRI	MSP	CHI	NHA	LVS	TAL	MAR	TEX	PHO	HOM	72nd	19	
2020	Cram Racing Enterprises	41	Chevy	DAY	LVS	CLT	ATL	HOM	POC	KEN	TEX	KAN	KAN	MCH	DRC	DOV	GTW	DAR	RCH	BRI; 30	LVS	TAL	KAN	TEX	MAR	PHO	74th	7	
2021	Cram Racing Enterprises	41	Chevy	DAY	DRC	LVS	ATL	BRD; 26	RCH	KAN	DAR	COA	CLT	TEX	NSH	POC	KNX; 22	GLN	GTW	DAR	BRI	LVS	TAL	MAR	PHO		61st	26	

^{*} Season still in progress

=== ARCA Racing Series ===
(key) (Bold – Pole position awarded by qualifying time. Italics – Pole position earned by points standings or practice time. * – Most laps led.)

ARCA Racing Series results
Year	Team	No.	Make	1	2	3	4	5	6	7	8	9	10	11	12	13	14	15	16	17	18	19	20	ARSC	Pts	Ref
2014	Empire Racing	82	Ford	DAY	MOB	SLM	TAL	TOL	NJE	POC	MCH	ELK	WIN	CHI	IRP	POC	BLN	ISF	MAD	DSF	SLM; 14	KEN	KAN	96th	160	

==== ARCA Menards Series West ====
ARCA Menards Series West results
Year	Team	No.	Make	1	2	3	4	5	6	7	8	9	10	11	AMSWC	Pts	Ref
2020	Fast Track Racing	10	Chevy	LVS	MMP	MMP	IRW	EVG	DCS	CNS	LVS	AAS	KCR	PHO; 19	31st	75	

^{*} Season still in progress
