= 2021 Lucas Oil 200 =

2021 Lucas Oil 200 Driven by General Tire
Race details
- Race 1 of 20 in the 2021 ARCA Menards Series
- Date: February 13, 2021
- Location: Daytona International Speedway in Daytona Beach, Florida
- Course: Permanent racing facility
- Course length: 2.5 miles (4.023 km)
- Distance: 82 laps, 205 mi (329.915 km)
- Scheduled distance: 80 laps, 200 mi (321.869 km)

Pole position
Driver	Drew Dollar	Venturini Motorsports
- Time: 49.489

Most laps led
Driver	Corey Heim	Venturini Motorsports
- Laps: 38

Winner
No. 20	Corey Heim	Venturini Motorsports

Television in the United States
- Network: FS1

The 2021 Lucas Oil 200 Driven by General Tire was an ARCA Menards Series race held on February 13, 2021. Contested over 82 laps due to an overtime finish, on the 2.5-mile (4.0 km) asphalt superspeedway, it was the first race of the 2021 ARCA Menards Series season.

== Entry list ==
No.	Driver	Team	Manufacturer
01	Chuck Hiers	Fast Track Racing	Toyota
02	Toni Breidinger	Young's Motorsports	Chevrolet
2	Nick Sanchez (R)	Rev Racing	Chevrolet
3	Willie Mullins	Mullins Racing	Chevrolet
06	Con Nicolopoulos	Wayne Peterson Racing	Chevrolet
7	Eric Caudell	CCM Racing	Ford
8	Sean Corr	Empire Racing	Chevrolet
10	Jason White	Fast Track Racing	Ford
11	Richard Garvie	Fast Track Racing	Ford
12	D. L. Wilson	Fast Track Racing	Toyota
15	Drew Dollar	Venturini Motorsports	Toyota
17	Tanner Gray	David Gilliland Racing	Ford
18	Ty Gibbs	Joe Gibbs Racing	Toyota
20	Corey Heim	Venturini Motorsports	Toyota
21	Jack Wood (R)	GMS Racing	Chevrolet
23	Bret Holmes	Bret Holmes Racing	Chevrolet
25	Gracie Trotter	Venturini Motorsports	Toyota
27	Tim Richmond	Richmond Clubb Motorsports	Toyota
28	Kyle Sieg	RSS Racing	Chevrolet
29	Derrick Lancaster	Derrick Lancaster Racing	Toyota
30	Brittney Zamora	Rette Jones Racing	Ford
32	Howie DiSavino III	Win-Tron Racing	Chevrolet
35	Greg Van Alst	Greg Van Alst Motorsports	Chevrolet
44	John Ferrier	Ferrier-McClure Racing	Chevrolet
45	Rich Bickle	Empire Racing	Chevrolet
46	Thad Moffitt	David Gilliland Racing	Ford
48	Owen Smith	Brad Smith Motorsports	Chevrolet
55	Derek Griffith	Venturini Motorsports	Toyota
63	Dave Mader III	Spraker Racing Enterprises	Chevrolet
69	Scott Melton	Kimmel Racing	Ford
73	Andy Jankowiak	Jankowiak Motorsports	Chevrolet
88	Scott Reeves	Reeves Racing	Chevrolet
94	Benny Chastain	Cram Racing Enterprises	Toyota
97	Jason Kitzmiller	CR7 Motorsports	Chevrolet

== Practice ==
Ty Gibbs was fastest in practice with a time of 49.323 seconds and a speed of 182.471 mph (293.659 km/h).

Pos	No.	Driver	Team	Manufacturer	Time	Speed
1	18	Ty Gibbs	Joe Gibbs Racing	Toyota	49.323	182.471
2	73	Andy Jankowiak	Jankowiak Motorsports	Ford	49.327	182.456
3	3	Willie Mullins	Mullins Racing	Chevrolet	49.336	182.423

== Qualifying ==
Drew Dollar scored the pole for the race with a time of 49.489 seconds and a speed of 181.859 mph (292.674 km/h).

=== Qualifying results ===
Pos	No	Driver	Team	Manufacturer	Time
1	15	Drew Dollar	Venturini Motorsports	Toyota	49.489
2	25	Gracie Trotter	Venturini Motorsports	Toyota	49.499
3	35	Greg Van Alst	Greg Van Alst Motorsports	Chevrolet	49.506
4	45	Rich Bickle	Empire Racing	Chevrolet	49.902
5	21	Jack Wood (R)	GMS Racing	Chevrolet	49.905
6	55	Derek Griffith	Venturini Motorsports	Toyota	49.998
7	8	Sean Corr	Empire Racing	Chevrolet	50.001
8	01	Chuck Hiers	Fast Track Racing	Toyota	50.011
9	20	Corey Heim	Venturini Motorsports	Toyota	50.059
10	17	Tanner Gray	David Gilliland Racing	Ford	50.079
11	73	Andy Jankowiak	Jankowiak Motorsports	Ford	50.086
12	2	Nick Sanchez (R)	Rev Racing	Chevrolet	50.087
13	18	Ty Gibbs	Joe Gibbs Racing	Toyota	50.106
14	29	Derrick Lancaster	Derrick Lancaster Racing	Toyota	50.112
15	23	Bret Holmes	Bret Holmes Racing	Chevrolet	50.231
16	46	Thad Moffitt	David Gilliland Racing	Ford	50.234
17	3	Willie Mullins	Mullins Racing	Chevrolet	50.285
18	28	Kyle Sieg	RSS Racing	Chevrolet	50.320
19	30	Brittney Zamora	Rette Jones Racing	Ford	50.368
20	63	Dave Mader III	Spraker Racing Enterprises	Chevrolet	50.378
21	97	Jason Kitzmiller	CR7 Motorsports	Chevrolet	50.485
22	10	Jason White	Fast Track Racing	Ford	50.491
23	69	Scott Melton	Kimmel Racing	Ford	50.497
24	44	John Ferrier	Ferrier McClure Racing	Chevrolet	50.500
25	32	Howie DiSavino III	Win-Tron Racing	Chevrolet	50.502
26	11	Richard Garvie	Fast Track Racing	Ford	51.406
27	48	Owen Smith	Brad Smith Motorsports	Chevrolet	51.538
28	88	Scott Reeves	Reeves Racing	Chevrolet	51.875
29	7	Eric Caudell	CCM Racing	Ford	51.882
30	27	Tim Richmond	Richmond Clubb Motorsports	Toyota	51.952
31	02	Toni Breidinger	Young's Motorsports	Chevrolet	51.985
32	12	D. L. Wilson	Fast Track Racing	Toyota	52.411
33	06	Con Nicolopoulos	Wayne Peterson Racing	Chevrolet	54.001
34	94	Benny Chastain	Cram Racing Enterprises	Toyota	58.960

== Race ==
=== Race results ===
Laps: 82

Pos	Grid	No	Driver	Team	Manufacturer	Laps	Points
1	9	20	Corey Heim	Venturini Motorsports	Toyota	82	48
2	1	15	Drew Dollar	Venturini Motorsports	Toyota	82	44
3	15	23	Bret Holmes	Bret Holmes Racing	Chevrolet	82	41
4	13	18	Ty Gibbs	Joe Gibbs Racing	Toyota	82	40
5	18	28	Kyle Sieg	RSS Racing	Chevrolet	82	39
6	14	29	Derrick Lancaster	Derrick Lancaster Racing	Toyota	82	39
7	10	17	Tanner Gray	David Gilliland Racing	Ford	82	38
8	11	73	Andy Jankowiak	Jankowiak Motorsports	Ford	82	36
9	5	21	Jack Wood (R)	GMS Racing	Chevrolet	82	35
10	7	8	Sean Corr	Empire Racing	Chevrolet	82	34
11	21	97	Jason Kitzmiller	CR7 Motorsports	Chevrolet	82	33
12	24	44	John Ferrier	Ferrier McClure Racing	Chevrolet	82	32
13	25	32	Howie DiSavino III	Win-Tron Racing	Chevrolet	82	31
14	22	10	Jason White	Fast Track Racing	Ford	82	30
15	4	45	Rich Bickle	Empire Racing	Chevrolet	82	29
16	29	7	Eric Caudell	CCM Racing	Ford	82	28
17	26	11	Richard Garvie	Fast Track Racing	Ford	82	27
18	31	02	Toni Breidinger	Young's Motorsports	Chevrolet	82	26
19	30	27	Tim Richmond	Richmond Clubb Motorsports	Toyota	81	25
20	34	94	Benny Chastain	Cram Racing Enterprises	Toyota	81	24
21	16	46	Thad Moffitt	David Gilliland Racing	Ford	80	23
22	33	06	Con Nicolopoulos	Wayne Peterson Racing	Chevrolet	80	22
23	2	25	Gracie Trotter	Venturini Motorsports	Toyota	78	22
24	28	88	Scott Reeves	Reeves Racing	Chevrolet	74	20
25	8	01	Chuck Hiers	Fast Track Racing	Toyota	63	19
26	32	12	D. L. Wilson	Fast Track Racing	Toyota	56	18
27	20	63	Dave Mader III	Spraker Racing Enterprises	Chevrolet	55	17
28	17	3	Willie Mullins	Mullins Racing	Chevrolet	32	16
29	3	35	Greg Van Alst	Greg Van Alst Motorsports	Chevrolet	28	15
30	6	55	Derek Griffith	Venturini Motorsports	Toyota	27	15
31	12	2	Nick Sanchez (R)	Rev Racing	Chevrolet	27	13
32	23	69	Scott Melton	Kimmel Racing	Ford	27	12
33	27	48	Owen Smith	Brad Smith Motorsports	Chevrolet	17	11
34	19	30	Brittney Zamora	Rette Jones Racing	Ford	7	10

Previous race: 2020 Speediatrics 150	ARCA Menards Series; 2021 season	Next race: 2021 General Tire 150 (Phoenix)
