= Devin Dodson =

American racing driver

- Dodson at Evergreen Speedway in 2019
- Born: Devin L. Dodson; March 15, 1999 (age 27); Ocean City, Maryland, U.S.

NASCAR FedEx Freight Truck Series career
- 1 race run over 1 year
- 2019 position: 93rd
- Best finish: 93rd (2019)
- First race: 2019 Eldora Dirt Derby (Eldora)
| Wins | Top tens | Poles |
|---|---|---|
| 0 | 0 | 0 |

ARCA Menards Series career
- 1 race run over 1 year
- Best finish: 80th (2019 ARCA Menards Series)
- First race: 2019 General Tire 150 (Charlotte)
| Wins | Top tens | Poles |
|---|---|---|
| 0 | 0 | 0 |

ARCA Menards Series East career
- 1 race run over 1 year
- Best finish: 50th (2019)
- First race: 2019 General Tire 125 (Dover)
| Wins | Top tens | Poles |
|---|---|---|
| 0 | 0 | 0 |

ARCA Menards Series West career
- 8 races run over 3 years
- Best finish: 18th (2018)
- First race: 2020 Port of Tucson Twin 100 #1 (Tucson)
- Last race: 2020 Arizona Lottery 100 (Phoenix)
| Wins | Top tens | Poles |
|---|---|---|
| 0 | 5 | 0 |
- Statistics up to date as of November 2, 2025.

Devin L. Dodson (born March 15, 1999) is an American professional stock car racing driver. He last competed part-time in the ARCA Menards Series West, driving the No. 7 Ford Fusion for JP Racing.

== Racing career ==
Dodson started his career in go-kart racing before moving up to dirt modifieds at the age of fourteen. A few years later, he stopped racing around his Maryland home and traveled to North Carolina and South Carolina to compete in late model racing. While racing late models, Dodson signed a driver development deal with Empire Racing Group, a satellite team of Richard Petty Motorsports.

In 2018, Dodson stepped up to regional touring series, competing with Jefferson Pitts Racing for a limited schedule in the NASCAR K&N Pro Series West. The choice to travel to the West Coast and race with JPR was based on the value per start with Dodson not having major corporate backing.

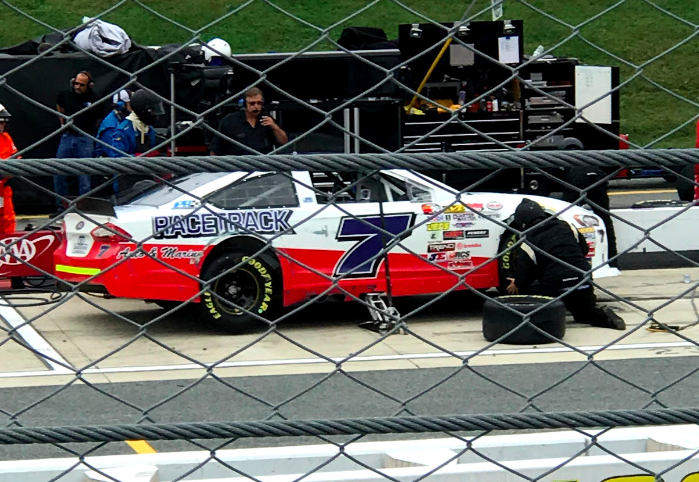
Dodson at Dover International Speedway in 2018

In May 2019, Dodson joined Vizion Motorsports for his ARCA Menards Series debut at Charlotte Motor Speedway. On July 26, 2019, it was announced that Dodson was scheduled to make his NASCAR national series debut driving the No. 32 for Reaume Brothers Racing in the NASCAR Gander Outdoors Truck Series in the 2019 Eldora Dirt Derby, with the potential to add more races with the team later in 2019. The announcement came after an opportunity with a different team fell through. Dodson would finish the race in 30th. He also competed in two NASCAR K&N Pro Series West races with JP Racing, finishing 8th at Evergreen Speedway and 17th at Meridian Speedway.

Dodson would run four ARCA Menards Series West races with JP Racing in 2020, scoring a best finish of fifth at Irwindale.

== Personal life ==
Dodson graduated from Stephen Decatur High School.

== Motorsports career results ==
=== NASCAR ===
(key) (Bold – Pole position awarded by qualifying time. Italics – Pole position earned by points standings or practice time. * – Most laps led.)

==== Gander Outdoors Truck Series ====
NASCAR Gander Outdoors Truck Series results
| Year | Team | No. | Make | 1 | 2 | 3 | 4 | 5 | 6 | 7 | 8 | 9 | 10 | 11 | 12 | 13 | 14 | 15 | 16 | 17 | 18 | 19 | 20 | 21 | 22 | 23 | NGOTC | Pts | Ref |
|---|---|---|---|---|---|---|---|---|---|---|---|---|---|---|---|---|---|---|---|---|---|---|---|---|---|---|---|---|---|
| 2019 | Reaume Brothers Racing | 32 | Chevy | DAY | ATL | LVS | MAR | TEX | DOV | KAN | CLT | TEX | IOW | GTW | CHI | KEN | POC | ELD; 30 | MCH | BRI | MSP | LVS | TAL | MAR | PHO | HOM | 93rd | 7 | |

==== K&N Pro Series East ====
NASCAR K&N Pro Series East results
| Year | Team | No. | Make | 1 | 2 | 3 | 4 | 5 | 6 | 7 | 8 | 9 | 10 | 11 | 12 | 13 | 14 | NKNPSEC | Pts | Ref |
|---|---|---|---|---|---|---|---|---|---|---|---|---|---|---|---|---|---|---|---|---|
| 2018 | Jefferson Pitts Racing | 7 | Ford | NSM | BRI | LGY | SBO | SBO | MEM | NJM | THO | NHA | IOW | GLN | GTW | NHA | DOV; 12 | 50th | 32 | |

=== ARCA Menards Series ===
(key) (Bold – Pole position awarded by qualifying time. Italics – Pole position earned by points standings or practice time. * – Most laps led.)

ARCA Menards Series results
| Year | Team | No. | Make | 1 | 2 | 3 | 4 | 5 | 6 | 7 | 8 | 9 | 10 | 11 | 12 | 13 | 14 | 15 | 16 | 17 | 18 | 19 | 20 | AMSC | Pts | Ref |
|---|---|---|---|---|---|---|---|---|---|---|---|---|---|---|---|---|---|---|---|---|---|---|---|---|---|---|
| 2019 | Vizion Motorsports | 35 | Toyota | DAY | FIF | SLM | TAL | NSH | TOL | CLT; 21 | POC | MCH | MAD | GTW | CHI | ELK | IOW | POC | ISF | DSF | SLM | IRP | KAN | 80th | 125 | |

==== ARCA Menards Series West ====
ARCA Menards Series West results
| Year | Team | No. | Make | 1 | 2 | 3 | 4 | 5 | 6 | 7 | 8 | 9 | 10 | 11 | 12 | 13 | 14 | AMSWC | Pts | Ref |
|---|---|---|---|---|---|---|---|---|---|---|---|---|---|---|---|---|---|---|---|---|
| 2018 | Jefferson Pitts Racing | 7 | Ford | KCR | TUS; 6 | TUS; 9 | OSS | | | | IOW; 11 | EVG | GTW | LVS | MER | AAS | KCR | 18th | 142 | |
| 2018 | Jefferson Pitts Racing | 27 | Ford | | | | | CNS; 9 | SON | DCS | | | | | | | | 18th | 142 | |
| 2019 | JP Racing | 27 | Ford | LVS | IRW | TUS | TUS | CNS | SON | DCS | IOW | EVG; 8 | GTW | MER; 17 | AAS | KCR | PHO | 32nd | 63 | |
| 2020 | JP Racing | 7 | Ford | LVS | MMP | MMP | IRW; 5 | EVG | DCS | CNS | LVS | AAS | KCR | PHO; 16 | | | | 17th | 117 | |
