= 2020 ARCA Menards Series (disambiguation) =

2020 ARCA Menards Series may refer to:

- 2020 ARCA Menards Series, the national division
- 2020 ARCA Menards Series East, a series that races in the eastern United States
- 2020 ARCA Menards Series West, a series that races in the western United States
