= Chris Hacker =

American racing driver

- Awards: 2013 CRA Late Model Sportsman Series Rookie of the Year

NASCAR O'Reilly Auto Parts Series career
- 4 races run over 1 year
- 2023 position: 94th
- Best finish: 94th (2023)
- First race: 2023 ToyotaCare 250 (Richmond)
- Last race: 2023 NASCAR Xfinity Series Championship Race (Phoenix)
Wins	Top tens	Poles
0	0	0

NASCAR FedEx Freight Truck Series career
- 14 races run over 3 years
- 2023 position: 45th
- Best finish: 42nd (2022)
- First race: 2021 Toyota 200 (Gateway)
- Last race: 2023 Craftsman 150 (Phoenix)
Wins	Top tens	Poles
0	0	0

ARCA Menards Series career
- 1 race run over 1 year
- Best finish: 86th (2021)
- First race: 2021 General Tire 150 (Charlotte)
Wins	Top tens	Poles
0	1	0

ARCA Menards Series West career
- 1 race run over 1 year
- Best finish: 27th (2020)
- First race: 2020 Arizona Lottery 100 (Phoenix)
Wins	Top tens	Poles
0	0	0
- Statistics up to date as of November 2, 2025.

Chris Hacker is an American professional stock car racing driver who last competed part-time in the NASCAR Craftsman Truck Series, driving the No. 30 Toyota Tundra for On Point Motorsports and the No. 02 Chevrolet Silverado for Young's Motorsports as well as part-time in the NASCAR Xfinity Series, driving the No. 38 Ford Mustang for RSS Racing and the No. 35 Chevrolet Camaro for Emerling-Gase Motorsports.

== Racing career ==
=== Early career ===
In 2008, Hacker started his racing career when he was eight years old, racing in Quarter Midgets, where he ranked second in his home state. From 2009 to 2011, he competed in the Bandolero bandits, where he won the Indiana state championship in 2010 and 2011. After two championship seasons in Bandoleros, he moved up to the INEX Legend Cars in 2012, where he won the Indianapolis Speedrome Championship in the Young Lions category. In 2013, he moved up from Legend Cars to the Champion Racing Association Sportsman category, where he became the youngest driver to ever to win a CRA event at the age of thirteen. He returned to the CRA for 2014, competing in the JEGS All-Star category, where he won the Sportsman of the Year Award.

=== ARCA Menards Series West ===
In 2020, Hacker signed with Fast Track Racing with a collaboration with Cram Racing Enterprises for one race in the ARCA Menards Series West, the Arizona Lottery 100 at ISM Raceway. He started 24th and finished fifteenth.

=== ARCA Menards Series ===
On August 28, 2020, Hacker announced on Twitter that he would be competing part-time in the NASCAR Camping World Truck Series in 2021 for an unknown amount of races, and two ARCA Menards Series races for Cram Racing Enterprises starting at Daytona. On January 11, 2021, Hacker tested positive for COVID-19, and was forced to quarantine, missing the ARCA test session at Daytona. Due to missing the crucial test session, this eliminated Hacker from competing at Daytona. Hacker made his official ARCA Menards Series debut at Charlotte Motor Speedway in the 2021 General Tire 150, starting twelfth and finishing tenth as the final lead lap driver.

=== Craftsman Truck Series ===
On June 1, 2021, Hacker announced on Twitter that he would run his first Truck Series race with Cram Racing Enterprises at Nashville Superspeedway on June 18. However, two days later, he would announce that he and Cram Racing Enterprises had parted ways due to "unforeseen circumstances." Hacker made his debut in the Camping World Truck Series on August 20, 2021, at World Wide Technology at Gateway in the Toyota 200. He drove the No. 34 truck for Reaume Brothers Racing. Hacker started 31st before ultimately finishing 27th, 23 laps down. On September 7, 2021, it was announced that Hacker would drive two races for Niece Motorsports, Las Vegas, and Martinsville.

Hacker remained with Reaume for the 2022 season. On July 21, 2022, it was announced that Hacker would drive for On Point Motorsports in the TSport 200 at Lucas Oil Indianapolis Raceway Park, with sponsorship coming from TJ's Team Foundation.

Hacker returned to On Point Motorsports in 2023, and will run four races with sponsorship from Morgan & Morgan. On August 17, NASCAR suspended Hacker indefinitely for violating Section 4.4. D. of the NASCAR Rule Book, stating actions detrimental to stock car racing - particularly on being charged with or convicted of significant criminal violations. Hacker was arrested on August 15 and charged with DWI.

=== Xfinity Series ===
On March 27, 2023, Hacker announced that he will make his Xfinity Series debut at Richmond Raceway, driving the No. 38 car for RSS Racing. Hacker proceeded to run inside the top-twenty for a majority of the race, before finishing in fourteenth. He would return to the No. 38 car for the race at New Hampshire. He filled in for the car's normal driver, Joe Graf Jr., in both of these races, who was driving the Joe Gibbs Racing No. 19 car instead. Hacker was on the initial race entry list at Watkins Glen in the No. 07 car for SS-Green Light Racing. Katherine Legge was originally scheduled to drive that car in that race, but after her sponsor (Blast Equality Collab) did not want to be on the car due to their members' connection with the writers' strike going on at the time, Hacker brought a different sponsor (Burdick's All Season Roofing). Hacker was replaced by Josh Bilicki in the aftermath of his second arrest. On October 25, Hacker was reinstated by NASCAR after completing their Road to Recovery program. On the same day, he announced that he would be driving the Emerling-Gase Motorsports No. 35 car in the race at Martinsville the next weekend.

== Personal life ==
Hacker is known as the first NASCAR driver born with a Brachial Plexus injury (nerve damage) and has weak and limited movement in his left arm. He's had three surgeries, and years of occupational and physical therapies, and still struggles with arm movement. Hacker has raised money that has helped pay for nearly 50 kids to attend a Brachial Plexus Injury camp. This allows kids to meet others with the same disability and to receive support from each other and hear inspirational stories from others that have suffered from this. Hacker was one of those speakers in 2014.

On February 15, 2024, on his way to Daytona, Hacker was involved in an accident when a semi-truck hit his car head-on in South Carolina. He suffered thoracic fractures in his spine, a ruptured spleen, a collapsed lung, a lacerated kidney, a lacerated adrenal gland, and internal bleeding.

== Legal issues ==
On June 27, 2017, Hacker was charged with DWI in Hamilton County, Indiana, as well as four related misdemeanors including possession of marijuana. He accepted a plea bargain, which dismissed four charges but sentenced him to a year of probation. Later on April 3, 2018, Hacker admitted to violating his probation in a judicial hearing and was placed under house arrest for 180 days.

On August 15, 2023, Hacker was arrested again for DWI in Huntersville, North Carolina, in addition to being charged with speeding and reckless driving. He was reinstated on October 25 after completing NASCAR's Road to Recovery program.

== Motorsports career results ==
=== NASCAR ===
(key) (Bold – Pole position awarded by qualifying time. Italics – Pole position earned by points standings or practice time. * – Most laps led.)

==== Xfinity Series ====
NASCAR Xfinity Series results
Year	Team	No.	Make	1	2	3	4	5	6	7	8	9	10	11	12	13	14	15	16	17	18	19	20	21	22	23	24	25	26	27	28	29	30	31	32	33	NXSC	Pts	Ref
2023	RSS Racing	38	Ford	DAY	CAL	LVS	PHO	ATL	COA	RCH; 14	MAR	TAL	DOV	DAR	CLT	POR	SON	NSH	CSC	ATL	NHA; 30	POC	ROA	MCH	IRC	GLN	DAY	DAR	KAN	BRI	TEX	ROV	LVS	HOM			94th	0^{1}	
2023	Emerling-Gase Motorsports	35	Chevy																																MAR; 30		94th	0^{1}	
2023	Emerling-Gase Motorsports	53	Chevy																																	PHO; 35	94th	0^{1}	

==== Craftsman Truck Series ====
NASCAR Craftsman Truck Series results
Year	Team	No.	Make	1	2	3	4	5	6	7	8	9	10	11	12	13	14	15	16	17	18	19	20	21	22	23	NCTC	Pts	Ref
2021	On Point Motorsports	31	Toyota	DAY	DRC	LVS	ATL	BRD	RCH	KAN	DAR	COA	CLT	TEX	NSH	POC	KNX	GLN	GTW; DNQ								52nd	42	
2021	Reaume Brothers Racing	34	Toyota																GTW; 27	DAR	BRI						52nd	42	
2021	Niece Motorsports	45	Chevy																			LVS; 37	TAL	MAR; 16			52nd	42	
2021	Reaume Brothers Racing	33	Toyota																						PHO; 27		52nd	42	
2022	Reaume Brothers Racing	33	Toyota	DAY	LVS	ATL; 17	COA	MAR	BRD	DAR	KAN						NSH; 29	MOH	POC				BRI; 33	TAL	HOM		42nd	62	
2022	Reaume Brothers Racing	33	Chevy									TEX; 31	CLT	GTW	SON	KNX											42nd	62	
2022	On Point Motorsports	30	Toyota																	IRP; 24	RCH	KAN					42nd	62	
2022	Reaume Brothers Racing	43	Toyota																							PHO; 26	42nd	62	
2023	On Point Motorsports	30	Toyota	DAY; 25	LVS	ATL	COA	TEX	BRD	MAR	KAN	DAR	NWS; 12	CLT	GTW; Wth					IRP; 29	MLW	KAN	BRI	TAL	HOM	PHO; 36	45th	31	
2023	Young's Motorsports	02	Chevy												GTW; 27	NSH	MOH	POC	RCH								45th	31	

^{*} Season still in progress
^{1} Ineligible for series points

=== ARCA Menards Series ===
(key) (Bold – Pole position awarded by qualifying time. Italics – Pole position earned by points standings or practice time. * – Most laps led. ** – All laps led.)

ARCA Menards Series results
Year	Team	No.	Make	1	2	3	4	5	6	7	8	9	10	11	12	13	14	15	16	17	18	19	20	AMSC	Pts	Ref
2021	Cram Racing Enterprises	94	Toyota	DAY	PHO	TAL	KAN	TOL	CLT; 10	MOH	POC	ELK	BLN	IOW	WIN	GLN	MCH	ISF	MLW	DSF	BRI	SLM	KAN	86th	34	

==== ARCA Menards Series West ====
ARCA Menards Series West results
Year	Team	No.	Make	1	2	3	4	5	6	7	8	9	10	11	AMSWC	Pts	Ref
2020	Cram Racing Enterprises	12	Toyota	LVS	MMP	MMP	IRW	EVG	DCS	CNS	LVS	AAS	KCR	PHO; 15	27th	79	
