= 2020 ToyotaCare 250 =

Race details
- Race 16 of 23 of the 2020 NASCAR Gander RV & Outdoors Truck Series
- Date: September 10, 2020
- Official name: ToyotaCare 250
- Location: Richmond, Virginia, Richmond Raceway
- Course: Permanent racing facility
- Course length: 0.75 miles (1.21 km)
- Distance: 250 laps, 187.50 mi (301.752 km)
- Average speed: 94.551 miles per hour (152.165 km/h)

Pole position
Driver	Austin Hill	Hattori Racing Enterprises
- Grid positions set by competition-based formula

Most laps led
Driver	Ben Rhodes	ThorSport Racing
- Laps: 66

Winner
No. 98	Grant Enfinger	ThorSport Racing

Television in the United States
- Network: Fox Sports 1
- Announcers: Vince Welch, Michael Waltrip, and Kurt Busch

Radio in the United States
- Radio: Motor Racing Network

The 2020 ToyotaCare 250 was the 16th stock car race of the 2020 NASCAR Gander RV & Outdoors Truck Series season, the 12th iteration of the event, and the final race of the regular season, therefore making the race the cutoff race to get into the Playoffs. Originally to be held on April 18, 2020, the race was postponed to Thursday, September 10, 2020, due to the COVID-19 pandemic. The race was held in Richmond, Virginia at Richmond Raceway, a 0.75 miles (1.21 km) permanent D-shaped oval racetrack. It took 250 laps to complete. At race's end, Grant Enfinger of ThorSport Racing would pass Matt Crafton with seven to go to win the race, the 5th NASCAR Gander RV & Outdoors Truck Series win of his career and the 3rd of the season. To fill the podium, Matt Crafton and Ben Rhodes, both driving for ThorSport Racing, finished 2nd and 3rd, respectively.

Austin Hill would win the regular season championship, garnering him a bonus 15 playoff points. The 10 drivers making the Playoffs would be Sheldon Creed, Zane Smith, Austin Hill, Grant Enfinger, Brett Moffitt, Ben Rhodes, Matt Crafton, Christian Eckes, Todd Gilliland, and Tyler Ankrum.

== Background ==
The layout of Richmond Raceway, the venue where the race was held.

Richmond Raceway is a 3/4-mile (1.2 km), D-shaped, asphalt race track located just outside Richmond, Virginia in Henrico County. It hosts the Monster Energy NASCAR Cup Series and Xfinity Series. Known as "America's premier short track", it formerly hosted a NASCAR Gander Outdoors Truck Series race, an IndyCar Series race, and two USAC sprint car races.

=== Entry list ===
#	Driver	Team	Make
00	Josh Reaume	Reaume Brothers Racing	Toyota
2	Sheldon Creed	GMS Racing	Chevrolet
02	Tate Fogleman	Young's Motorsports	Chevrolet
3	Jordan Anderson	Jordan Anderson Racing	Chevrolet
4	Raphaël Lessard	Kyle Busch Motorsports	Toyota
6	Norm Benning	Norm Benning Racing	Chevrolet
9	Codie Rohrbaugh	CR7 Motorsports	Chevrolet
10	Jennifer Jo Cobb	Jennifer Jo Cobb Racing	Chevrolet
13	Johnny Sauter	ThorSport Racing	Ford
15	Tanner Gray	DGR-Crosley	Ford
16	Austin Hill	Hattori Racing Enterprises	Toyota
17	David Ragan	DGR-Crosley	Ford
18	Christian Eckes	Kyle Busch Motorsports	Toyota
19	Derek Kraus	McAnally–Hilgemann Racing	Toyota
20	Spencer Boyd	Young's Motorsports	Chevrolet
21	Zane Smith	GMS Racing	Chevrolet
22	Austin Wayne Self	AM Racing	Chevrolet
23	Brett Moffitt	GMS Racing	Chevrolet
24	Sam Mayer	GMS Racing	Chevrolet
26	Tyler Ankrum	GMS Racing	Chevrolet
30	Danny Bohn	On Point Motorsports	Toyota
33	Josh Bilicki	Reaume Brothers Racing	Toyota
38	Todd Gilliland	Front Row Motorsports	Ford
40	Carson Hocevar	Niece Motorsports	Chevrolet
41	Ryan Huff	Cram Racing Enterprises	Chevrolet
44	Natalie Decker	Niece Motorsports	Chevrolet
45	Trevor Bayne	Niece Motorsports	Chevrolet
49	Ray Ciccarelli	CMI Motorsports	Chevrolet
51	Chandler Smith	Kyle Busch Motorsports	Toyota
52	Stewart Friesen	Halmar Friesen Racing	Toyota
56	Timmy Hill	Hill Motorsports	Chevrolet
68	Clay Greenfield	Clay Greenfield Motorsports	Toyota
83	Tim Viens	CMI Motorsports	Chevrolet
88	Matt Crafton	ThorSport Racing	Ford
98	Grant Enfinger	ThorSport Racing	Ford
99	Ben Rhodes	ThorSport Racing	Ford
Official entry list

== Starting lineup ==
The starting lineup was based on a metric qualifying system based on the results and fastest lap of the last race, the 2020 South Carolina Education Lottery 200 and owner's points. As a result, Austin Hill of Hattori Racing Enterprises won the pole.

Pos.	#	Driver	Team	Make
1	16	Austin Hill	Hattori Racing Enterprises	Toyota
2	99	Ben Rhodes	ThorSport Racing	Ford
3	18	Christian Eckes	Kyle Busch Motorsports	Toyota
4	23	Brett Moffitt	GMS Racing	Chevrolet
5	98	Grant Enfinger	ThorSport Racing	Ford
6	19	Derek Kraus	McAnally–Hilgemann Racing	Toyota
7	4	Raphaël Lessard	Kyle Busch Motorsports	Toyota
8	38	Todd Gilliland	Front Row Motorsports	Ford
9	21	Zane Smith	GMS Racing	Chevrolet
10	88	Matt Crafton	ThorSport Racing	Ford
11	26	Tyler Ankrum	GMS Racing	Chevrolet
12	2	Sheldon Creed	GMS Racing	Chevrolet
13	52	Stewart Friesen	Halmar Friesen Racing	Toyota
14	51	Chandler Smith	Kyle Busch Motorsports	Toyota
15	56	Timmy Hill	Hill Motorsports	Chevrolet
16	02	Tate Fogleman	Young's Motorsports	Chevrolet
17	22	Austin Wayne Self	AM Racing	Chevrolet
18	30	Danny Bohn	On Point Motorsports	Toyota
19	15	Tanner Gray	DGR-Crosley	Ford
20	13	Johnny Sauter	ThorSport Racing	Ford
21	17	David Ragan	DGR-Crosley	Ford
22	68	Clay Greenfield	Clay Greenfield Motorsports	Toyota
23	3	Jordan Anderson	Jordan Anderson Racing	Chevrolet
24	45	Trevor Bayne	Niece Motorsports	Chevrolet
25	24	Sam Mayer	GMS Racing	Chevrolet
26	20	Spencer Boyd	Young's Motorsports	Chevrolet
27	44	Natalie Decker	Niece Motorsports	Chevrolet
28	9	Codie Rohrbaugh	CR7 Motorsports	Chevrolet
29	00	Josh Reaume	Reaume Brothers Racing	Toyota
30	40	Carson Hocevar	Niece Motorsports	Chevrolet
31	10	Jennifer Jo Cobb	Jennifer Jo Cobb Racing	Chevrolet
32	6	Norm Benning	Norm Benning Racing	Chevrolet
33	33	Josh Bilicki	Reaume Brothers Racing	Toyota
34	49	Ray Ciccarelli	CMI Motorsports	Chevrolet
35	41	Ryan Huff	Cram Racing Enterprises	Chevrolet
36	83	Tim Viens	CMI Motorsports	Chevrolet
Official starting lineup

== Race results ==
Stage 1 Laps: 70

Fin	#	Driver	Team	Make	Pts
1	21	Zane Smith	GMS Racing	Chevrolet	10
2	98	Grant Enfinger	ThorSport Racing	Ford	9
3	16	Austin Hill	Hattori Racing Enterprises	Toyota	8
4	52	Stewart Friesen	Halmar Friesen Racing	Toyota	7
5	99	Ben Rhodes	ThorSport Racing	Ford	6
6	19	Derek Kraus	McAnally–Hilgemann Racing	Toyota	5
7	24	Sam Mayer	GMS Racing	Chevrolet	4
8	23	Brett Moffitt	GMS Racing	Chevrolet	3
9	02	Tate Fogleman	Young's Motorsports	Chevrolet	2
10	18	Christian Eckes	Kyle Busch Motorsports	Toyota	1

Stage 2 Laps: 70

Fin	#	Driver	Team	Make	Pts
1	99	Ben Rhodes	ThorSport Racing	Ford	10
2	98	Grant Enfinger	ThorSport Racing	Ford	9
3	16	Austin Hill	Hattori Racing Enterprises	Toyota	8
4	17	David Ragan	DGR-Crosley	Ford	0
5	21	Zane Smith	GMS Racing	Chevrolet	6
6	23	Brett Moffitt	GMS Racing	Chevrolet	5
7	88	Matt Crafton	ThorSport Racing	Ford	4
8	2	Sheldon Creed	GMS Racing	Chevrolet	3
9	38	Todd Gilliland	Front Row Motorsports	Ford	2
10	56	Timmy Hill	Hill Motorsports	Chevrolet	1

Stage 3 Laps: 110

Fin	St	#	Driver	Team	Make	Laps	Led	Status	Pts
1	5	98	Grant Enfinger	ThorSport Racing	Ford	250	18	running	58
2	10	88	Matt Crafton	ThorSport Racing	Ford	250	25	running	39
3	2	99	Ben Rhodes	ThorSport Racing	Ford	250	66	running	50
4	4	23	Brett Moffitt	GMS Racing	Chevrolet	250	32	running	41
5	11	26	Tyler Ankrum	GMS Racing	Chevrolet	250	0	running	32
6	28	9	Codie Rohrbaugh	CR7 Motorsports	Chevrolet	250	0	running	31
7	21	17	David Ragan	DGR-Crosley	Ford	249	0	running	0
8	1	16	Austin Hill	Hattori Racing Enterprises	Toyota	249	65	running	45
9	15	56	Timmy Hill	Hill Motorsports	Chevrolet	249	0	running	29
10	13	52	Stewart Friesen	Halmar Friesen Racing	Toyota	249	0	running	34
11	9	21	Zane Smith	GMS Racing	Chevrolet	249	44	running	42
12	14	51	Chandler Smith	Kyle Busch Motorsports	Toyota	249	0	running	25
13	12	2	Sheldon Creed	GMS Racing	Chevrolet	249	0	running	27
14	17	22	Austin Wayne Self	AM Racing	Chevrolet	249	0	running	23
15	16	02	Tate Fogleman	Young's Motorsports	Chevrolet	249	0	running	24
16	19	15	Tanner Gray	DGR-Crosley	Ford	249	0	running	21
17	8	38	Todd Gilliland	Front Row Motorsports	Ford	249	0	running	22
18	3	18	Christian Eckes	Kyle Busch Motorsports	Toyota	249	0	running	20
19	25	24	Sam Mayer	GMS Racing	Chevrolet	249	0	running	22
20	26	20	Spencer Boyd	Young's Motorsports	Chevrolet	247	0	running	17
21	22	68	Clay Greenfield	Clay Greenfield Motorsports	Toyota	247	0	running	16
22	30	40	Carson Hocevar	Niece Motorsports	Chevrolet	247	0	running	15
23	6	19	Derek Kraus	McAnally–Hilgemann Racing	Toyota	246	0	running	19
24	23	3	Jordan Anderson	Jordan Anderson Racing	Chevrolet	246	0	running	13
25	33	33	Josh Bilicki	Reaume Brothers Racing	Toyota	245	0	running	0
26	7	4	Raphaël Lessard	Kyle Busch Motorsports	Toyota	245	0	running	11
27	20	13	Johnny Sauter	ThorSport Racing	Ford	242	0	running	10
28	35	41	Ryan Huff	Cram Racing Enterprises	Chevrolet	239	0	running	9
29	24	45	Trevor Bayne	Niece Motorsports	Chevrolet	237	0	running	8
30	32	6	Norm Benning	Norm Benning Racing	Chevrolet	235	0	running	7
31	34	49	Ray Ciccarelli	CMI Motorsports	Chevrolet	231	0	running	6
32	29	00	Josh Reaume	Reaume Brothers Racing	Toyota	217	0	running	5
33	18	30	Danny Bohn	On Point Motorsports	Toyota	175	0	electrical	5
34	27	44	Natalie Decker	Niece Motorsports	Chevrolet	155	0	running	5
35	36	83	Tim Viens	CMI Motorsports	Chevrolet	50	0	crash	5
36	31	10	Jennifer Jo Cobb	Jennifer Jo Cobb Racing	Chevrolet	0	0	clutch	5
Official race results

Previous race: 2020 South Carolina Education Lottery 200	NASCAR Gander RV & Outdoors Truck Series; 2020 season	Next race: 2020 UNOH 200 Presented by Ohio Logistics
