= 2020 UNOH 200 =

2020 UNOH 200 Presented by Ohio Logistics
Race details
- Race 17 of 23 of the 2020 NASCAR Gander RV & Outdoors Truck Series
- Date: September 17, 2020
- Official name: UNOH 200 Presented by Ohio Logistics
- Location: Bristol, Tennessee, Bristol Motor Speedway
- Course: Permanent racing facility
- Course length: 0.533 miles (0.858 km)
- Distance: 200 laps, 106.6 mi (171.556 km)
- Scheduled distance: 200 laps, 106.6 mi (171.556 km)
- Average speed: 82.053 miles per hour (132.052 km/h)

Pole position
Driver	Grant Enfinger	ThorSport Racing
- Grid positions set by competition-based formula

Most laps led
Driver	Brett Moffitt	GMS Racing
- Laps: 117

Winner
No. 24	Sam Mayer	GMS Racing

Television in the United States
- Network: Fox Sports 1
- Announcers: Vince Welch and Michael Waltrip

Radio in the United States
- Radio: Motor Racing Network

The 2020 UNOH 200 Presented by Ohio Logistics was the 17th stock car race of the 2020 NASCAR Gander RV & Outdoors Truck Series season, the 23rd iteration of the event, and the 1st race of the Playoffs and the Round of 10. The race was held on Thursday, September 17, 2020, in Bristol, Tennessee at Bristol Motor Speedway, a 0.533 miles (0.858 km) permanent oval-shaped racetrack. The race took the scheduled 200 laps to complete. At race's end, Sam Mayer of GMS Racing would win his first ever race in the NASCAR Gander RV & Outdoors Truck Series. To fill the rest of the podium, Brett Moffitt of GMS Racing and Tanner Gray of DGR-Crosley would finish 2nd and 3rd, respectively.

== Background ==
The layout of Bristol Motor Speedway, the venue where the race was held.

The Bristol Motor Speedway, formerly known as Bristol International Raceway and Bristol Raceway, is a NASCAR short track venue located in Bristol, Tennessee. Constructed in 1960, it held its first NASCAR race on July 30, 1961. Despite its short length, Bristol is among the most popular tracks on the NASCAR schedule because of its distinct features, which include extraordinarily steep banking, an all concrete surface, two pit roads, and stadium-like seating. It has also been named one of the loudest NASCAR tracks.

=== Entry list ===
#	Driver	Team	Make
00	Josh Bilicki	Reaume Brothers Racing	Toyota
2	Sheldon Creed	GMS Racing	Chevrolet
02	Tate Fogleman	Young's Motorsports	Chevrolet
3	Jordan Anderson	Jordan Anderson Racing	Chevrolet
4	Raphaël Lessard	Kyle Busch Motorsports	Toyota
6	Norm Benning	Norm Benning Racing	Chevrolet
8	Camden Murphy	NEMCO Motorsports	Chevrolet
9	Codie Rohrbaugh	CR7 Motorsports	Chevrolet
10	Jennifer Jo Cobb	Jennifer Jo Cobb Racing	Chevrolet
13	Johnny Sauter	ThorSport Racing	Ford
15	Tanner Gray	DGR-Crosley	Ford
16	Austin Hill	Hattori Racing Enterprises	Toyota
18	Christian Eckes	Kyle Busch Motorsports	Toyota
19	Derek Kraus	McAnally–Hilgemann Racing	Toyota
20	Spencer Boyd	Young's Motorsports	Chevrolet
21	Zane Smith	GMS Racing	Chevrolet
22	Austin Wayne Self	AM Racing	Chevrolet
23	Brett Moffitt	GMS Racing	Chevrolet
24	Sam Mayer	GMS Racing	Chevrolet
26	Tyler Ankrum	GMS Racing	Chevrolet
30	Danny Bohn	On Point Motorsports	Toyota
33	Josh Reaume	Reaume Brothers Racing	Toyota
38	Todd Gilliland	Front Row Motorsports	Ford
40	Carson Hocevar	Niece Motorsports	Chevrolet
41	Cody Erickson	Cram Racing Enterprises	Chevrolet
42	Ross Chastain	Niece Motorsports	Chevrolet
44	Natalie Decker	Niece Motorsports	Chevrolet
45	Trevor Bayne	Niece Motorsports	Chevrolet
49	Ray Ciccarelli*	CMI Motorsports	Chevrolet
51	Chandler Smith	Kyle Busch Motorsports	Toyota
52	Stewart Friesen	Halmar Friesen Racing	Toyota
56	Timmy Hill	Hill Motorsports	Chevrolet
68	Clay Greenfield	Clay Greenfield Motorsports	Toyota
75	Parker Kligerman	Henderson Motorsports	Chevrolet
83	Tim Viens*	CMI Motorsports	Chevrolet
88	Matt Crafton	ThorSport Racing	Ford
98	Grant Enfinger	ThorSport Racing	Ford
99	Ben Rhodes	ThorSport Racing	Ford
Official entry list

*Withdrew due to damage suffered at the 2020 ToyotaCare 250.

== Starting lineup ==
The starting lineup was determined on a metric qualifying system based on the fastest lap and results of the 2020 ToyotaCare 250 and owner's points. As a result, Grant Enfinger of ThorSport Racing won the pole.

Pos.	#	Driver	Team	Make
1	98	Grant Enfinger	ThorSport Racing	Ford
2	23	Brett Moffitt	GMS Racing	Chevrolet
3	99	Ben Rhodes	ThorSport Racing	Ford
4	88	Matt Crafton	ThorSport Racing	Ford
5	16	Austin Hill	Hattori Racing Enterprises	Toyota
6	21	Zane Smith	GMS Racing	Chevrolet
7	26	Tyler Ankrum	GMS Racing	Chevrolet
8	2	Sheldon Creed	GMS Racing	Chevrolet
9	51	Chandler Smith	Kyle Busch Motorsports	Toyota
10	18	Christian Eckes	Kyle Busch Motorsports	Toyota
11	38	Todd Gilliland	Front Row Motorsports	Ford
12	52	Stewart Friesen	Halmar Friesen Racing	Toyota
13	56	Timmy Hill	Hill Motorsports	Chevrolet
14	9	Codie Rohrbaugh	CR7 Motorsports	Chevrolet
15	19	Derek Kraus	McAnally–Hilgemann Racing	Toyota
16	15	Tanner Gray	DGR-Crosley	Ford
17	24	Sam Mayer	GMS Racing	Chevrolet
18	22	Austin Wayne Self	AM Racing	Chevrolet
19	4	Raphaël Lessard	Kyle Busch Motorsports	Toyota
20	02	Tate Fogleman	Young's Motorsports	Chevrolet
21	40	Carson Hocevar	Niece Motorsports	Chevrolet
22	20	Spencer Boyd	Young's Motorsports	Chevrolet
23	13	Johnny Sauter	ThorSport Racing	Ford
24	45	Trevor Bayne	Niece Motorsports	Chevrolet
25	3	Jordan Anderson	Jordan Anderson Racing	Chevrolet
26	68	Clay Greenfield	Clay Greenfield Motorsports	Toyota
27	30	Danny Bohn	On Point Motorsports	Toyota
28	44	Natalie Decker	Niece Motorsports	Chevrolet
29	33	Josh Reaume	Reaume Brothers Racing	Toyota
30	6	Norm Benning	Norm Benning Racing	Chevrolet
31	00	Josh Bilicki	Reaume Brothers Racing	Toyota
32	10	Jennifer Jo Cobb	Jennifer Jo Cobb Racing	Chevrolet
33	41	Cody Erickson	Cram Racing Enterprises	Chevrolet
34	42	Ross Chastain	Niece Motorsports	Chevrolet
35	75	Parker Kligerman	Henderson Motorsports	Chevrolet
36	8	Camden Murphy	NEMCO Motorsports	Chevrolet
Withdrew
WD	49	Ray Ciccarelli	CMI Motorsports	Chevrolet
WD	83	Tim Viens	CMI Motorsports	Chevrolet
Official starting lineup

== Race results ==
Stage 1 Laps: 55

Fin	#	Driver	Team	Make	Pts
1	23	Brett Moffitt	GMS Racing	Chevrolet	10
2	26	Tyler Ankrum	GMS Racing	Chevrolet	9
3	2	Sheldon Creed	GMS Racing	Chevrolet	8
4	21	Zane Smith	GMS Racing	Chevrolet	7
5	98	Grant Enfinger	ThorSport Racing	Ford	6
6	88	Matt Crafton	ThorSport Racing	Ford	5
7	24	Sam Mayer	GMS Racing	Chevrolet	4
8	19	Derek Kraus	McAnally–Hilgemann Racing	Toyota	3
9	13	Johnny Sauter	ThorSport Racing	Ford	2
10	18	Christian Eckes	Kyle Busch Motorsports	Toyota	1

Stage 2 Laps: 55

Fin	#	Driver	Team	Make	Pts
1	26	Tyler Ankrum	GMS Racing	Chevrolet	10
2	13	Johnny Sauter	ThorSport Racing	Ford	9
3	23	Brett Moffitt	GMS Racing	Chevrolet	8
4	21	Zane Smith	GMS Racing	Chevrolet	7
5	24	Sam Mayer	GMS Racing	Chevrolet	6
6	19	Derek Kraus	McAnally–Hilgemann Racing	Toyota	5
7	88	Matt Crafton	ThorSport Racing	Ford	4
8	40	Carson Hocevar	Niece Motorsports	Chevrolet	3
9	75	Parker Kligerman	Henderson Motorsports	Chevrolet	2
10	18	Christian Eckes	Kyle Busch Motorsports	Toyota	1

Stage 3 Laps: 90

Fin	St	#	Driver	Team	Make	Laps	Led	Status	Pts
1	17	24	Sam Mayer	GMS Racing	Chevrolet	200	30	running	50
2	2	23	Brett Moffitt	GMS Racing	Chevrolet	200	117	running	53
3	16	15	Tanner Gray	DGR-Crosley	Ford	200	0	running	34
4	35	75	Parker Kligerman	Henderson Motorsports	Chevrolet	200	0	running	35
5	9	51	Chandler Smith	Kyle Busch Motorsports	Toyota	200	0	running	32
6	1	98	Grant Enfinger	ThorSport Racing	Ford	200	0	running	37
7	7	26	Tyler Ankrum	GMS Racing	Chevrolet	200	53	running	49
8	34	42	Ross Chastain	Niece Motorsports	Chevrolet	200	0	running	0
9	23	13	Johnny Sauter	ThorSport Racing	Ford	200	0	running	39
10	4	88	Matt Crafton	ThorSport Racing	Ford	200	0	running	36
11	8	2	Sheldon Creed	GMS Racing	Chevrolet	200	0	running	34
12	10	18	Christian Eckes	Kyle Busch Motorsports	Toyota	200	0	running	27
13	3	99	Ben Rhodes	ThorSport Racing	Ford	200	0	running	24
14	11	38	Todd Gilliland	Front Row Motorsports	Ford	200	0	running	23
15	15	19	Derek Kraus	McAnally–Hilgemann Racing	Toyota	200	0	running	30
16	6	21	Zane Smith	GMS Racing	Chevrolet	199	0	running	35
17	21	40	Carson Hocevar	Niece Motorsports	Chevrolet	199	0	running	23
18	19	4	Raphaël Lessard	Kyle Busch Motorsports	Toyota	199	0	running	19
19	36	8	Camden Murphy	NEMCO Motorsports	Chevrolet	199	0	running	18
20	13	56	Timmy Hill	Hill Motorsports	Chevrolet	197	0	running	17
21	20	02	Tate Fogleman	Young's Motorsports	Chevrolet	197	0	running	16
22	26	68	Clay Greenfield	Clay Greenfield Motorsports	Toyota	197	0	running	15
23	25	3	Jordan Anderson	Jordan Anderson Racing	Chevrolet	197	0	running	14
24	27	30	Danny Bohn	On Point Motorsports	Toyota	196	0	running	13
25	5	16	Austin Hill	Hattori Racing Enterprises	Toyota	195	0	running	12
26	31	00	Josh Bilicki	Reaume Brothers Racing	Toyota	193	0	running	0
27	22	20	Spencer Boyd	Young's Motorsports	Chevrolet	192	0	running	10
28	32	10	Jennifer Jo Cobb	Jennifer Jo Cobb Racing	Chevrolet	190	0	running	9
29	28	44	Natalie Decker	Niece Motorsports	Chevrolet	186	0	running	8
30	33	41	Cody Erickson	Cram Racing Enterprises	Chevrolet	183	0	running	7
31	14	9	Codie Rohrbaugh	CR7 Motorsports	Chevrolet	167	0	brakes	6
32	12	52	Stewart Friesen	Halmar Friesen Racing	Toyota	167	0	running	5
33	18	22	Austin Wayne Self	AM Racing	Chevrolet	153	0	crash	5
34	30	6	Norm Benning	Norm Benning Racing	Chevrolet	38	0	suspension	5
35	29	33	Josh Reaume	Reaume Brothers Racing	Toyota	9	0	suspension	5
36	24	45	Trevor Bayne	Niece Motorsports	Chevrolet	200	0	disqualified	5
Official race results

Previous race: 2020 ToyotaCare 250	NASCAR Gander RV & Outdoors Truck Series; 2020 season	Next race: 2020 World of Westgate 200
