= Alex Sedgwick =

British racing driver (born 1999)

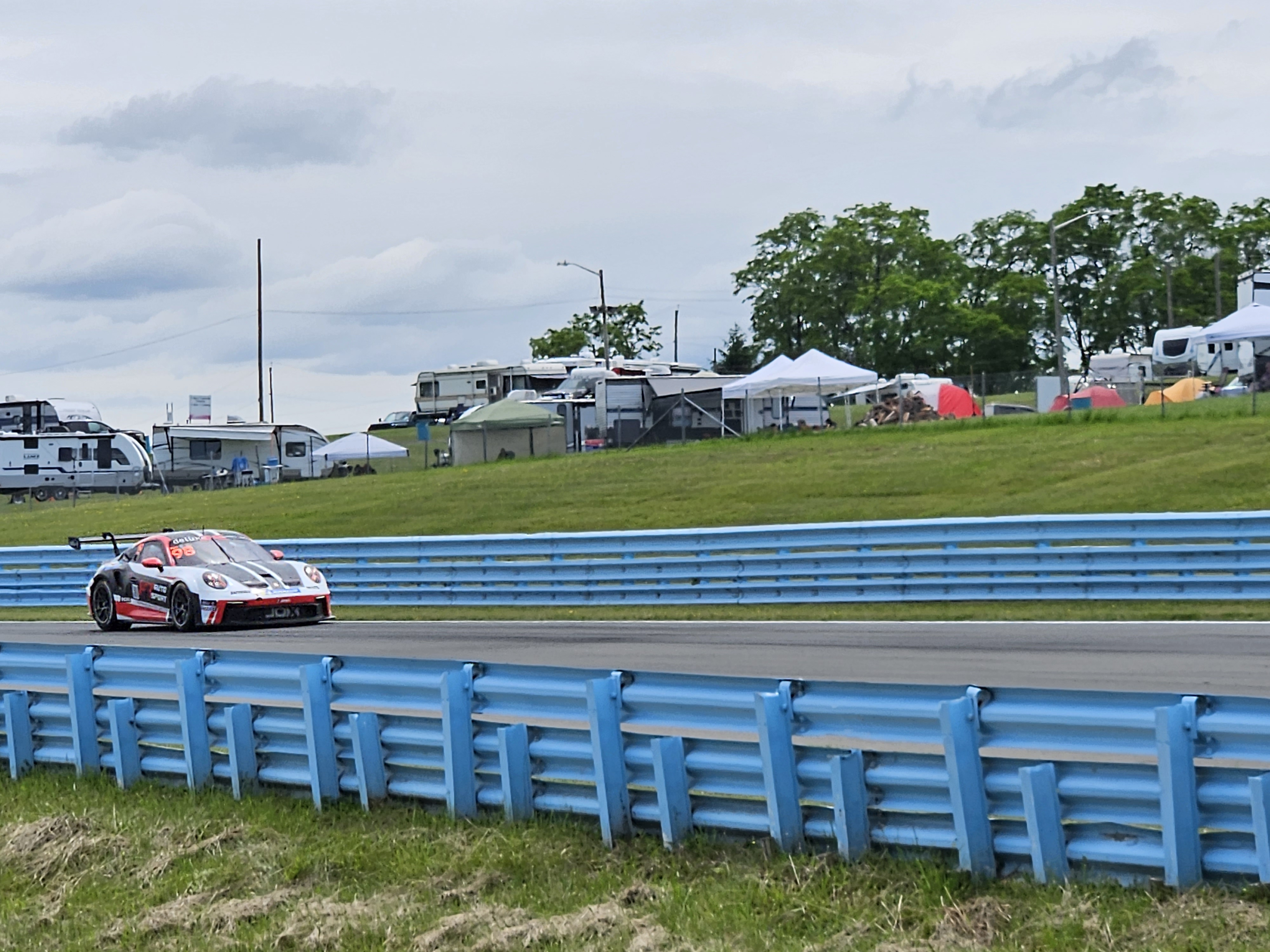
- Sedgwick driving at Watkins Glen in 2023
- Nationality: British
- Born: Alexander Thomas Sedgwick; February 17, 1999 (age 27)

Porsche Carrera Cup North America career
- Debut season: 2023
- Current team: JDX Racing
- Categorisation: FIA International Grade B NASCAR Trucks & Xfinity (short tracks & road courses); ARCA (Superspeedways, ovals up to 1 mile & road courses)
- Years active: 2023 – 2026

Previous series
- 2011–2022: NASCAR Whelen Euro Series, ARCA Menards Series West, Porsche Sprint Challenge North America, French F4 Championship, Renault UK Clio Cup, Ginetta Junior Championship, Ginetta Junior Scholarship, Super One Series, WTP LGM British karting

ARCA Menards Series West career
- 1 race run over 1 year
- Best finish: 27th (2020)
- First race: 2020 Arizona Lottery 100 (Phoenix)
Wins	Top tens	Poles
0	0	0
- Statistics up to date as of May 16, 2024.

Alexander Thomas Sedgwick (born February 17, 1999) is a British racing driver. He currently competes full-time in the GT World Challenge America for RennSport1. He previously competed in the Porsche Carrera Cup North America, NASCAR Whelen Euro Series, ARCA Menards Series West, Porsche Sprint Challenge North America, French F4 Championship, Renault UK Clio Cup, Ginetta Junior Championship, Ginetta Junior Scholarship, Super One Series, WTP LGM British Karting Championship, and cadet karting.

== Career ==
=== Cadet karting ===
At the age of eight, Sedgwick began competing in local club-level karting competitions. He won the club championship at one of his local tracks in 2008, his first full season, and would move to the WTP LGM British Karting Championship in 2009. He would finish 23rd in the standings in 2009 before improving to ninth in 2010. In 2011, he would run with a professional organization for the first time. He won the WTP Cadet Winter Series before taking the British title, winning six out of seven races. Along with his championship, he broke the records for most wins in a season, becoming the first person to win all three heats, start from pole position, set the fastest lap and win the final race in the same event, and having the highest points total ever.

=== Super One ===
After his 2011 successes, Sedgwick moved up to the Junior ranks, racing in the Super One Series against the likes of Lando Norris and Zhou Guanyu. Despite racing the series with a much smaller budget than his competitors, he was able to post several top-five finishes.

=== Ginetta Junior Championship ===
In 2013, Sedgwick would enter the Ginetter Junior Scholarship, a competition in which young drivers are subjected to three days of driving, media, and fitness assessments, with a grand prize of a fully funded season in the Ginetta Junior Championship the following year. Despite never having driven a race car before and just having learned to use the clutch a week before, Sedgwick won the competition in only his first attempt. After winning the Ginetta Junior Scholarship, Sedgwick competed in a full season of the Ginetta Junior Championship. Sedgwick finished tenth in the final standings, scoring one class win during the season.

=== French F4 and Renault UK Clio Cup ===
After taking a short break to complete his GCSE exams, Sedgwick would compete in the Magny-Cours round of the FFSA French F4 Championship, finishing inside the top ten in his single-seater debut. He also competed in the final two rounds of the Renault UK Clio Cup, qualifying fifth on debut at Silverstone and placing top-five at Brands Hatch.

=== International Endurance Racing ===
Sedgwick made his international debut at the 2016 Dubai 24 Hours. He would finish seventh in his class. He again competed in Dubai in the 2017 Dubai 24 Hours, leading a brand new team to a second-place finish. That summer, he qualified on pole for and won the 12 Hours of Imola.

=== NASCAR Whelen Euro Series ===
In 2018, Sedwick returned to full-time racing competition, placing 12th in the NASCAR Whelen Euro Series' PRO class, posting two top-fives and five-top tens, in addition to scoring four podiums within his class. Returning to the series in 2019, Sedwick opened with a class podium in Valencia. However, Sedgwick decided midseason to take a break from the series due to reliability issues with the car. He returned for the final round, again scoring a class podium by winning the Junior Trophy.

In 2020, during the COVID-19 pandemic lockdowns, Sedgwick took part in the EuroNASCAR Esports Series.

In 2021, Sedgwick returned to the Euro series for his home race, scoring a podium despite not driving the car since 2019. On last minute notice, he was again called up to drive at Vallelunga. Holding out through issues with the car, he would drive to the top-ten, scoring another class podium.

=== ARCA Menards Series West and ARCA Testing ===
When Sedgwick's racing plans for 2020 were disrupted by COVID-19, he focused on his dream of racing in the United States. His work paid off when he was able to make his ARCA Menards Series West debut at Phoenix Raceway in November 2020. Driving for Bill McAnally Racing as a teammate to eventual series champion Jesse Love, whom he would finish ahead of in the race, Sedgwick finished 13th in his oval debut.

In January 2021, Sedgwick would get a chance to test an ARCA Menards Series car at Daytona International Speedway in the annual ARCA test. Driving the No. 94 Camry for Cram Racing Enterprises with sponsorship from NBA 2K21, Sedgwick would place 21st of 56 drivers. The test would earn Sedgwick a license to race on superspeedways.

=== PT Autosport Opportunity ===
While taking a break from racing, Sedgwick became a European Operations Manager for a luxury travel company. His role at the company led to a chance involvement in 2022 with PT Autosport, an organization that aims to provide development opportunities for aspiring drivers, engineers, and business professionals. PT Autosport entered Sedgwick into the Porsche Sprint Challenge North America, where he would qualify on pole, only to have to start at the back of the grid due to a technical issue. He would then make his way through the field and finish on the podium in his first race in a GT car.

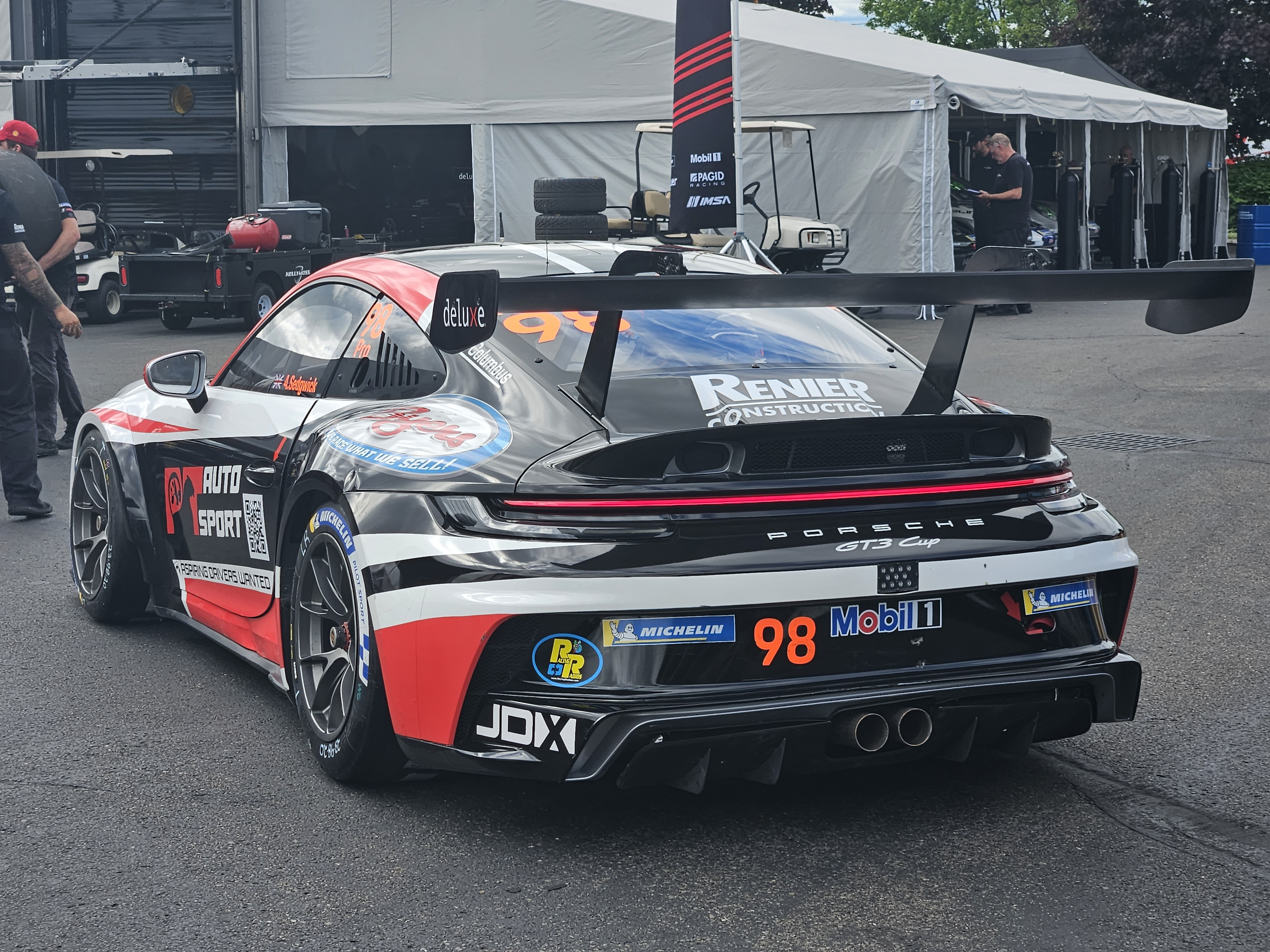
Sedgwick's Porsche at Watkins Glen in 2023

In 2023, Sedgwick and PT Autosport stepped up to full-time competition in the Porsche Carrera Cup North America, a schedule filled with tracks Sedgwick was unfamiliar with. Learning fast, he took his maiden podium in front of F1 crowds in Miami and scored more podiums at Road America, Indianapolis, and COTA, as well as setting a new lap record at Laguna Seca and finishing the season fourth in the PRO category.

In 2024, Sedgwick would again run with PT Autosport with JDX Racing to run the Porsche Carrera Cup North America. He started the season with two top-fives and another Miami podium.

== Racing record ==
=== Career summary ===
Season	Series	Team	Races	Wins	Poles	F/Laps	Podiums	Points	Position
2014	Ginetta Junior Championship	JHR Developments	20	0	0	0	0	240	10th
2015	French F4 Championship	FFSA Academy	3	0	0	0	0	0	NC†
2015	Renault UK Clio Cup	Team Cooksport	4	0	0	0	0	46	18th
2016	24H Series - A2	Preptech UK							
2017	24H Series - A2	Team Cooksport							
2018	NASCAR Whelen Euro Series - Elite 1	MRT by Nocentini	2	0	0	0	0	338	12th
2018	NASCAR Whelen Euro Series - Elite 1	Braxx Racing	6	0	0	0	0	338	12th
2018	NASCAR Whelen Euro Series - Elite 2	MRT by Nocentini	2	0	0	0	0	26	42nd
2019	NASCAR Whelen Euro Series - Elite 1	Braxx Racing	8	0	0	0	0	254	23rd
2020	ARCA Menards Series West	Bill McAnally Racing	1	0	0	0	0	81	26th
2021	NASCAR Whelen Euro Series - EuroNASCAR PRO	Academy Motorsport	2	0	0	0	0	48	34th
2022	NASCAR Whelen Euro Series - EuroNASCAR PRO	SpeedHouse	2	0	0	0	0	45	38th
2022	Porsche Sprint Challenge North America	PT Autosport	2	0	0	1	1	87	30th
2023	Porsche Carrera Cup North America	PT Autosport with JDX Racing	16	0	0	1	5	181	4th
2024	Porsche Carrera Cup North America	JDX Racing	16	1	4	0	6	225	**3rd**
2024	992 Endurance Cup	MRS-GT Racing	1	0	0	0	0	N/A	28th
2025	GT World Challenge America - Pro	RennSport1	13	2	0	3	10	236	**3rd**
2025	Nürburgring Langstrecken-Serie - BMW M240i	PTerting Sports by Up2Race	2	0	0	0	2	22	NC
2026	GT World Challenge America - Pro	Dollahite Racing	5	0	0	0	3	68	6th
2026	GT World Challenge America - Pro-Am	Dollahite Racing	1	0	0	0	0	0	NC†

=== Complete Ginetta Junior Championship results ===
(key) (Races in bold indicate pole position in class) (Races in italics indicate fastest lap in class)

Year	Team	1	2	3	4	5	6	7	8	9	10	11	12	13	14	15	16	17	18	19	20	Pos	Pts
2014	JHR Developments	BHI; 1; 12	BHI; 2 Ret	DON; 1; 8	DON; 2; 9	THR; 1; 14	THR; 2; 13	OUL; 1; 12	OUL; 2; 5	CRO; 1; 6	CRO; 2; 10	SNE; 1; 6	SNE; 2; 13	KNO; 1; 4	KNO; 2; 11	ROC; 1; 9	ROC; 2; 9	SIL; 1; 7	SIL; 2 Ret	BHGP; 1; 5	BHGP; 2; 8	10th	240

=== ARCA Menards Series West ===
(key) (Bold – Pole position awarded by qualifying time. Italics – Pole position earned by points standings or practice time. * – Most laps led.)

ARCA Menards Series West results
Year	Team	No.	Make	1	2	3	4	5	6	7	8	9	10	11	AMSWC	Pts	Ref
2020	Bill McAnally Racing	12W	Toyota	LVS	MMP	MMP	IRW	EVG	DCS	CNS	LVS	AAS	KCR	PHO; 13	26th	81	
