= 2020 ARCA Menards Series West =

67th season of the ARCA Menards Series West

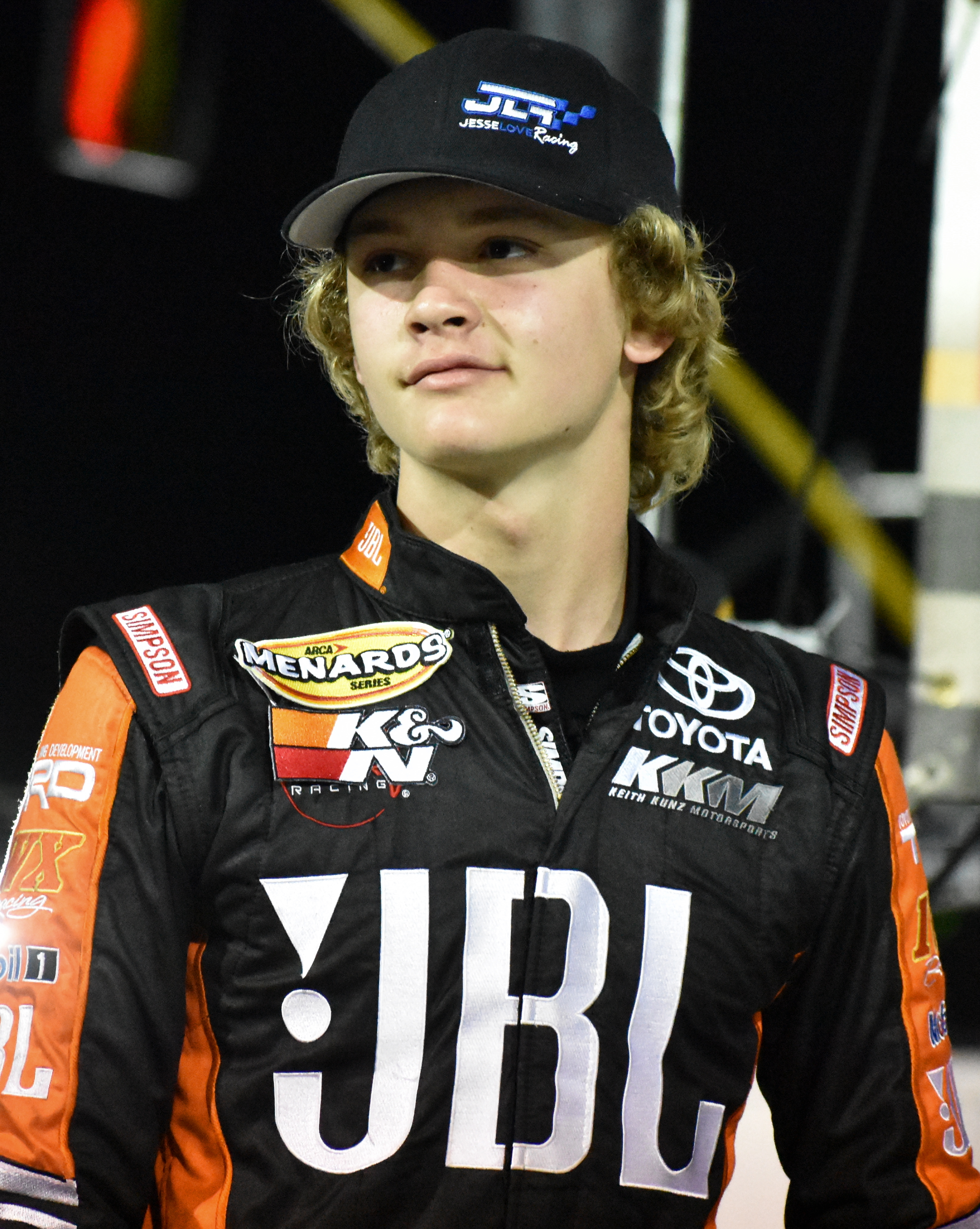
Jesse Love, the 2020 ARCA Menards Series West champion.

Blaine Perkins, driving the No. 9 car for Sunrise Ford Racing, finished second behind Love in the championship by 25 points.

Gracie Trotter finished third in the championship.

The 2020 ARCA Menards Series West was the sixty-seventh season of the ARCA Menards Series West, a regional stock car racing series sanctioned by NASCAR. It began on February 20 at the Las Vegas Motor Speedway Bullring with the Star Nursery 150, and ended on November 6 at ISM Raceway with the Arizona Lottery 100.

2020 marked the first season of this series under the ARCA banner.

When the season was put on hold due to the COVID-19 pandemic, drivers from all NASCAR series, including a few ARCA Menards Series drivers, participated in the inaugural eNASCAR iRacing Pro Invitational Series during that time.

== Teams and drivers ==
=== Complete schedule ===
Manufacturer	Team	No.	Driver	Crew chief
Ford	Sunrise Ford Racing	6	Trevor Huddleston	Bill Sedgwick
Ford	Sunrise Ford Racing	9	Blaine Perkins	Jeff Schrader
Toyota	Bill McAnally Racing	16	Gio Scelzi (R)	John Camilleri
Toyota	Bill McAnally Racing	19	Jesse Love (R)	Kyle Wolosek 7 Jason Dickenson 4
Toyota	Bill McAnally Racing	99	Gracie Trotter (R)	Roger Bracken
Toyota	Central Coast Racing	13	Todd Souza	Michael Muñoz
Toyota	Performance P-1 Motorsports	77	Takuma Koga	Ron Norman 6 Gere Kennon Jr. 1 Will Harris 1 Chris Greaney 3
Toyota 3 Chevrolet 8	Hillis Racing	27	Bobby Hillis Jr.	Henry Manh 9 Ed Ash 2

=== Limited schedule ===
Manufacturer	Team	No.	Driver	Crew chief	Rounds
Chevrolet	Chad Bryant Racing	22	Kris Wright (Note: Entry was fielded in a collaboration with GMS Racing.)	Paul Andrews	1
Chevrolet	Fast Track Racing	10	Cody Erickson	Mike Sroufe	1
Chevrolet	GMS Racing	21	Sam Mayer	Mardy Lindley	2
Chevrolet	Kart Idaho Racing	11	Chris Lowden	Sonny Wahl	1
Chevrolet	Kart Idaho Racing	11	Dustin Ash	Sonny Wahl	1
Chevrolet	Legal Limit Motorsports	80	Brian Kamisky	Derek Copeland	2
Chevrolet	Steve McGowan Motorsports	17	Zane Smith	Sean Samuels	1
Chevrolet	Win-Tron Racing	32	Howie DiSavino III	Jamie Jones	1
Chevrolet	Zach Telford Racing	17	Zach Telford	Danny Christiani	1
Ford	Borneman Motorsports	8	Johnny Borneman III	Will Harris	1
Ford	DGR-Crosley	4	David Gilliland	Derek Smith	1
Ford	DGR-Crosley	17	Taylor Gray	Blake Bainbridge 2 Seth Smith 2 Chad Johnston 1	5
Ford	DGR-Crosley	54	Todd Gilliland	Chris Lawson	1
Ford	JP Racing	7	Austin Reed	Jerry Pitts	1
Ford	JP Racing	7	Kris Wright	Jerry Pitts	2
Ford	JP Racing	7	Devin Dodson	Jerry Pitts	2
Ford	JP Racing	7	Kyle Keller	Jerry Pitts	2
Ford	Rette Jones Racing	30	Justin Lofton	Mark Rette	1
Toyota	Bill McAnally Racing	12	Lawless Alan (R)	Gary Collins	4
Toyota	Bill McAnally Racing	12	Alex Sedgwick	Kevin Bellicourt	1
Toyota	Bill McAnally Racing	50	Holley Hollan (R)	Henry Nascimento	10
Toyota	Fast Track Racing	12	Chris Hacker (Note: Entry was fielded in a collaboration with Cram Racing Enterprises.)	Kevin Cram	1
Toyota	Joe Gibbs Racing	18	Ty Gibbs	Mark McFarland	1
Toyota	Naake-Klauer Motorsports	54	Joey Iest	Mike Naake	4
Toyota	Velocity Racing	78	Jack Wood	Ty Joiner	8
Toyota	Venturini Motorsports	15	Drew Dollar	Shannon Rursch	1
Toyota	Venturini Motorsports	20	Ryan Repko	Kevin Reed Jr.	1
Toyota	Venturini Motorsports	20	Corey Heim	Billy Venturini	1
Toyota	Venturini Motorsports	25	Mason Diaz	Kevin Reed	2
Toyota	Venturini Motorsports	25	Keith Rocco	Kevin Reed	1
Chevrolet 2 Ford 1	Jefferson Racing	42	Will Rodgers	Jeff Jefferson	2
Chevrolet 2 Ford 1	Jefferson Racing	42	Brittney Zamora	Jeff Jefferson	1
Chevrolet 1 Toyota 8	BMI Racing	88	Bridget Burgess	Sarah Burgess	9

=== Changes ===
==== Teams ====
- On August 14, 2019, longtime West Series team Jefferson Pitts Racing announced that they would be splitting up into two teams, with Jeff Jefferson owning Jefferson Racing (and the new No. 42 car) and Jerry Pitts owning JP Racing (and the previously existing No. 7 car). This continued into 2020, with both teams running part-time schedules.
- Bill McAnally Racing announced that they would be fielding four full-time teams in 2020 (up from three in 2019), with their No. 50 Toyota, previously a part-time car, running full-time in 2020 along with the Nos. 16, 19, and 99. However, on January 31, 2020, they announced a fifth full-time car, the No. 12, for Lawless Alan, who drove the same car part-time last season. This brought BMR up to five full-time teams for five rookie drivers.
- Venturini Motorsports fielded a West Series team for the first time in 2020, with Corey Heim driving a car for them at Sonoma and the season finale at Phoenix (as well as three races in the ARCA East Series and two in the ARCA Menards Series).

==== Drivers ====
- On January 14, 2020, Bill McAnally Racing announced their 2020 driver lineup, with all four of their drivers new to the team and running for rookie of the year.
  - Gio Scelzi replaced 2019 champion Derek Kraus in the No. 16, who moved to the Truck Series full-time with the team.
  - Jesse Love replaced Hailie Deegan in the No. 19, who left BMR and Toyota's driver development program to compete in the 20-race ARCA Menards Series with DGR-Crosley as well as join Ford's driver development program.
  - Holley Hollan drove the No. 50 full-time, which was run part-time in 2019.
  - Gracie Trotter drove the No. 99, replacing Brittney Zamora, who started the 2020 season without a ride.
- On January 16, 2020, Corey Heim was announced as the driver of Venturini Motorsports' new part-time ARCA West Series team.
- On January 29, 2020, it was announced that Blaine Perkins would be driving full-time for Sunrise Ford Racing in 2020, replacing 2019 rookie of the year and 2nd-place points finisher Jagger Jones as a driver on that team. Perkins was without a ride in any NASCAR or ARCA Series in 2019, and drove full-time for two years (2016 and 2017) in the West Series for Steve Portenga's team before running part-time in the ARCA Menards Series in 2018 for Mason Mitchell's team. Perkins drove the No. 9, replacing Trevor Huddleston, who moved from the No. 9 to the No. 6 which was Jones' car in 2019.
- On January 31, 2020, it was announced that Lawless Alan, who drove the No. 12 part-time for Bill McAnally Racing the previous year, would run full-time in the same car this season in addition to the other four drivers the team announced two weeks prior.
- On March 16, 2020, Zamora, who had lost her ride in the McAnally No. 99 to Trotter, tweeted that she would be attempting the race at Irwindale in the No. 42 Ford for Jefferson Racing.

== Schedule ==
On January 6, 2020, NASCAR released the schedule for the 2020 season. As part of the unification of the East and West series with the ARCA Menards Series, the schedule decreased from fourteen races in 2019 to eleven races in 2020. The number of races was originally ten, however, an additional race at Utah Motorsports Campus was announced on March 3, 2020.

As part of the unification of the East and West series with the ARCA Menards Series, the West participated in the Sioux Chief Showdown, a ten-race series within the main ARCA series featuring drivers from each of the three branches.

In terms of TV, NBC continued to broadcast the West Series schedule on tape delay as they had in the past.

No.	Race title	Track	Date
1	Star Nursery 150	Las Vegas Motor Speedway (Bullring), Las Vegas, Nevada	February 20
2	ENEOS/Sunrise Ford Twin 30	Utah Motorsports Campus, Grantsville, Utah	June 27
3	ENEOS/Sunrise Ford Twin 30	Utah Motorsports Campus, Grantsville, Utah	June 27
4	ENEOS 125 presented by NAPA Auto Parts	Irwindale Speedway, Irwindale, California	July 4
5	ENEOS/NAPA Auto Parts 100	Evergreen Speedway, Monroe, Washington	August 7
6	ENEOS/NAPA Auto Parts 150	Douglas County Speedway, Roseburg, Oregon	August 8
7	ENEOS 150 presented by NAPA Auto Parts	Colorado National Speedway, Dacono, Colorado	August 22
8	General Tire 150 (Note: LVMS Bullring's second race replaced the Meridian Speedway race.)	Las Vegas Motor Speedway (Bullring), Las Vegas, Nevada	September 26
9	NAPA 125 presented by CashInTheCan.com	All American Speedway, Roseville, California	October 23
10	NAPA/ENEOS 125 presented by West Coast Stock Car Hall of Fame	Kern County Raceway Park, Bakersfield, California	October 25
11	Arizona Lottery 100	ISM Raceway, Avondale, Arizona	November 7

=== Schedule changes due to the COVID-19 pandemic ===
- It was announced that all ARCA (and NASCAR) races would be postponed through May 3, which affected the race at Irwindale, which would need to be run at another time in the season. That race was previously scheduled for March 28. It would be run on July 4. The races at Douglas County, Utah Motorsports Campus, and Colorado would also end up being postponed from their original dates of May 16, May 23, and June 6, respectively.
- The Procore 200 at Sonoma Raceway was cancelled and replaced by a second race at Utah Motorsports Campus which was run as a doubleheader with their other race on the schedule, which was postponed from May 23 to June 27.
- On July 14, 2020, it was announced that the race at Douglas County would be on Saturday, August 8, which was the date of the Evergreen race, which was bumped back one day to Friday, August 7. The two races were ran on back to back days. The tracks are a six-hour drive from each other and teams traveled from Evergreen to Douglas County in the night and morning between the two races. It was also announced that the race at Meridian would not be on August 29 as previously scheduled, and that the race would remain on the schedule but would have a different date later in the year after the month of August. However, the race at Meridian Speedway was later cancelled and replaced with a race at the Las Vegas Motor Speedway Bullring.

== Results and standings ==
=== Races ===
No.	Race	Pole Position	Most laps led	Winning driver	Manufacturer	No.	Winning team
1	Star Nursery 150	Sam Mayer	Sam Mayer	Sam Mayer	Chevrolet	21	GMS Racing
2	ENEOS/Sunrise Ford Twin 30	Blaine Perkins	Jesse Love	Jesse Love	Toyota	19	Bill McAnally Racing
3	ENEOS/Sunrise Ford Twin 30	Blaine Perkins	Blaine Perkins	Blaine Perkins	Ford	9	Sunrise Ford Racing
4	ENEOS 125 presented by NAPA Auto Parts	Jesse Love	Jesse Love	Jesse Love	Toyota	19	Bill McAnally Racing
5	ENEOS/NAPA Auto Parts 100	Blaine Perkins	Blaine Perkins	Blaine Perkins	Ford	9	Sunrise Ford Racing
6	ENEOS/NAPA Auto Parts 150	Gio Scelzi	Blaine Perkins	Blaine Perkins	Ford	9	Sunrise Ford Racing
7	ENEOS 150 presented by NAPA Auto Parts	Jesse Love	Jesse Love	Jesse Love	Toyota	19	Bill McAnally Racing
8	General Tire 150	Jesse Love	Gracie Trotter	Gracie Trotter	Toyota	99	Bill McAnally Racing
9	NAPA 125 presented by CashInTheCan.com	Taylor Gray	Taylor Gray	Gio Scelzi	Toyota	16	Bill McAnally Racing
10	NAPA/ENEOS 125 presented by West Coast Stock Car Hall of Fame	Jesse Love	Taylor Gray	Taylor Gray	Ford	17	DGR-Crosley
11	Arizona Lottery 100	David Gilliland	Ty Gibbs	David Gilliland	Ford	4	DGR-Crosley

=== Drivers' championship ===
Note: The pole-winner also receives one bonus point, similar to the previous ARCA points system used until 2019 and unlike NASCAR.

(key) Bold – Pole position awarded by time. Italics – Pole position set by final practice results or rainout. * – Most laps led. ** – All laps led.

Pos	Driver	LVS	MMP	MMP	IRW	EVG	DCS	CNS	LVS	AAS	KCR	PHO	Points
1	Jesse Love **(R)**	2	1*	2	**1***	4	3	**1***	**3**	4	**8**	14	613
2	Blaine Perkins	3	**11**	1**	4	1**	1*	2	10	5	3	25	588
3	Gracie Trotter **(R)**	4	7	7	3	5	2	4	1*	10	5	9	582
4	Trevor Huddleston	5	13	5	2	2	5	6	12	3	4	7	572
5	Gio Scelzi **(R)**	10	3	4	14	3	**4**	3	2	1	9	27	560
6	Todd Souza	8	6	6	7	7	11	8	5	2	7	17	550
7	Takuma Koga	11	14	14	10	9	8	9	6	9	12	23	509
8	Bobby Hillis Jr.	13	10	13	16	10	10	11	8	13	11	20	499
9	Holley Hollan **(R)**	12	9	10	11	6	7	7	9	6	15		448
10	Bridget Burgess	17			12	11	9	10	7	11	14	22	383
11	Jack Wood	7			15	8	6	5		8	10	24	319
12	Joey Iest	14							11		13	12	176
13	Taylor Gray		4	11						**7***	1*	3	161
14	Kris Wright		2	3								18	159
15	Lawless Alan **(R)**	6	12	12	9								137
16	Sam Mayer	**1***										21	122
17	Devin Dodson				5							16	117
18	David Gilliland											**1**	98
19	Ty Gibbs											2*	94
20	Todd Gilliland											4	90
21	Drew Dollar											5	89
22	Justin Lofton											6	88
23	Corey Heim											8	86
24	Keith Rocco											10	84
25	Howie DiSavino III											11	83
26	Alex Sedgwick											13	81
27	Chris Hacker											15	79
28	Kyle Keller								4		6		78
29	Mason Diaz									12	2		76
30	Will Rodgers		5	8									75
31	Cody Erickson											19	75
32	Brian Kamisky		8	9									71
33	Zane Smith											26	68
34	Johnny Borneman III				6								38
35	Dustin Ash				8								36
36	Austin Reed	9											35
37	Brittney Zamora				13								31
38	Chris Lowden	15											29
39	Zach Telford	16											28
40	Ryan Repko										16		28

== See also ==
- 2020 NASCAR Cup Series
- 2020 NASCAR Xfinity Series
- 2020 NASCAR Gander RV & Outdoors Truck Series
- 2020 ARCA Menards Series
- 2020 ARCA Menards Series East
- 2020 NASCAR Whelen Modified Tour
- 2020 NASCAR Pinty's Series
- 2020 NASCAR Whelen Euro Series
- 2020 CARS Tour
- 2020 eNASCAR iRacing Pro Invitational Series
- 2020 EuroNASCAR Esports Series
