= Gio Scelzi =

American auto racing driver

- Scelzi at Evergreen Speedway in 2020
- Born: November 28, 2001 (age 24) Fresno, California, U.S.
- Relatives: Gary Scelzi (father)

ARCA Menards Series West career
- Debut season: 2020
- Current team: Bill McAnally Racing
- Years active: 2020–present
- Car number: 16
- Engine: Toyota
- Crew chief: John Camilleri
- Starts: 11
- Championships: 0
- Wins: 1
- Poles: 0
- Statistics up to date as of November 7, 2020.

Giovanni Scelzi (born November 28, 2001) is an American racing driver who competes in the High Limit Racing Series for Spire Motorsports.

== Racing career ==
Scelzi began his career in the micro-sprint ranks, driving at Plaza Park Raceway. Racing at Lemoore Speedway as a nine-year-old, Scelzi posted 24 wins during that season.

At age sixteen, Scelzi moved from his hometown of Fresno, California to Indianapolis, Indiana to be closer to sprint car competition. In September of that year, he became the youngest winner in World of Outlaws history, winning a preliminary event at the National Open at Williams Grove Speedway in Pennsylvania.

In 2019, Scelzi became the youngest driver to win a feature at Knoxville Raceway, using the highest groove on the racetrack to take the lead. He also won his first career United States Auto Club midget race, taking the checkered flag at Placerville Speedway.

Scelzi during ARCA West qualifying at Evergreen in 2020.

Scelzi started his 2020 season by racing at the Chili Bowl in Tulsa, Oklahoma. On January 13, Scelzi announced a partnership with Guy Forbrook to run a limited number of sprint car races in the Midwest United States, saying that he wanted to scale back his sprint car efforts for the year. On January 14, Scelzi was confirmed for a full ARCA Menards Series West schedule for Bill McAnally Racing, driving the organization's No. 16 entry. A midwinter trip to Australia to race sprint cars was cancelled when Scelzi left Indy Race Cars, the team he drove for in 2018 and 2019, to join Forbrook. He won his first Pro Late Model race at New Smyrna Speedway on February 9, capitalizing on a last lap crash/penalty combination that took the top two cars out of contention. In June, Scelzi returned to his family sprint car team for some All Star Circuit of Champions races and also joined Tucker Boat Motorsports for some sprint car races during Indiana Midget Week. Scelzi scored a career-best ARCA West finish of second at the Las Vegas Motor Speedway Bullring in September. In the following race, Scelzi executed a bump-and-run maneuver on Taylor Gray during the penultimate lap to claim his first ARCA win. He would finish the season fifth in points.

In 2023, Scelzi joined the World of Outlaws full time, pursuing Rookie of the Year honors. His time with KCP Racing ended after the Double Down Duels at Eldora in July 2025, and joined Clauson-Marshall Racing to finish out the High Limit Racing season after Tyler Courtney's season-ending injury.

== Personal life ==
Gio is the son of former drag racing driver Gary Scelzi, and is the younger brother of sprint car driver Dominic Scelzi. He attended Clovis Online High School in a blended learning model with in-person and online instruction. Gio currently resides in Grimes, Iowa.

== Motorsports career results ==
=== ARCA Menards Series ===
(key) (Bold – Pole position awarded by qualifying time. Italics – Pole position earned by points standings or practice time. * – Most laps led.)

ARCA Menards Series results
Year	Team	No.	Make	1	2	3	4	5	6	7	8	9	10	11	12	13	14	15	16	17	18	19	20	AMSC	Pts	Ref
2020	Bill McAnally Racing	16	Toyota	DAY	PHO; 10	TAL	POC	IRP	KEN	IOW; 11	KAN	TOL	TOL	MCH	DAY	GTW; 13	L44	TOL	BRI	WIN	MEM	ISF	KAN	33rd	98	

==== ARCA Menards Series East ====
ARCA Menards Series East results
Year	Team	No.	Make	1	2	3	4	5	6	AMSEC	Pts	Ref
2020	Bill McAnally Racing	16	Toyota	NSM; 13	TOL	DOV	TOL	BRI	FIF	38th	31	

==== ARCA Menards Series West ====
ARCA Menards Series West results
Year	Team	No.	Make	1	2	3	4	5	6	7	8	9	10	11	AMSWC	Pts	Ref
2020	Bill McAnally Racing	16	Toyota	LVS; 10	MMP; 3	MMP; 4	IRW; 14	EVG; 3	DCS; 4	CNS; 3	LVS; 2	AAS; 1	KCR; 9	PHO; 27	5th	560	
