= Howie DiSavino III =

American racing driver

- Born: Howard DiSavino III; April 10, 2001 (age 25); Chesterfield, Virginia, U.S.

NASCAR O'Reilly Auto Parts Series career
- 5 races run over 1 year
- 2022 position: 52nd
- Best finish: 52nd (2022)
- First race: 2022 Call 811 Before You Dig 250 (Martinsville)
- Last race: 2022 Dead On Tools 250 (Martinsville)
Wins	Top tens	Poles
0	0	0

NASCAR FedEx Freight Truck Series career
- 5 races run over 1 year
- 2021 position: 47th
- Best finish: 47th (2021)
- First race: 2021 ToyotaCare 250 (Richmond)
- Last race: 2021 Victoria's Voice Foundation 200 (Las Vegas)
Wins	Top tens	Poles
0	0	0
- Statistics up to date as of July 16, 2022.

Howard DiSavino III (born April 10, 2001) is an American professional stock car racing driver. He last competed part-time in the NASCAR Xfinity Series, driving the No. 44 and 45 Chevrolet Camaros for Alpha Prime Racing.

== Racing career ==
DiSavino became interested in racing when his parents obtained free tickets to an Arena Racing USA event near Richmond, Virginia when he was eight. When he was thirteen, DiSavino would begin arena racing and then race late models for the first time at the age of fifteen.

After competing in a CARS Late Model Stock Tour event at Dominion Raceway early in 2019, DiSavino signed with Win-Tron Racing to make his debut in the ARCA Menards Series at Elko Speedway in July of that year. He would score a top-ten finish in his ARCA debut after qualifying twelfth. He ran one more race later in the year at IRP, where he crashed out and finished 16th.

It was announced on January 21, 2020, that DiSavino would return to Win-Tron to run a part-time schedule of ARCA races in their No. 32 again, along with making his Truck Series debut at the series' new race at Richmond Raceway, his home track. This would have marked Win-Tron's first time fielding a Truck Series team by themselves since 2015 when they fielded the No. 35 Toyota. The team had a presence in the series through partnerships with both SS-Green Light Racing and AM Racing in 2016 and 2017 and then again with Hill Motorsports in the season-opening Daytona race at the start of the season. No truck number was announced in the press release, although DiSavino's consultant (PMG Motorsports Management) and sponsor (Bud's Plumbing, Heating & Air Conditioning) posted images of his truck on Facebook, which had the No. 32 on it, Win-Tron's number in ARCA. The number belonged to Reaume Brothers Racing in 2019, but they dropped it for the 2020 season as a result of them switching one of their three trucks to the No. 00, opening the door for Win-Tron to pick up the number and use it for their restarted truck team with DiSavino. However, due to the COVID-19 pandemic rescheduling the Richmond race to September, these plans were cancelled, and DiSavino only drove in ARCA that year.

In 2021, DiSavino remained in the No. 32 ARCA car part-time, now a part of AM Racing after Win-Tron merged with that team, which competed full-time in the Truck Series with Austin Wayne Self. The two teams had an alliance for multiple years and shared a race shop starting in 2020. DiSavino made his first start at Daytona that year. On April 5, it was announced that DiSavino would get to make his Truck Series debut, which would still be at Richmond and with the same sponsors (Bud's as well as KEES Vacations), although it would instead be in the No. 3 for Jordan Anderson Racing, a team that is also housed in the AM Racing shop and has an alliance with them.

In 2022, it was announced that DiSavino would run a partial schedule in the NASCAR Xfinity Series with Alpha Prime Racing. He attempted to make his series debut at the Richmond race in the No. 45, but failed to qualify. However, he did qualify for the April Martinsville race, driving the No. 44 Chevy for the same team in which he failed to finish.

== Motorsports career results ==
=== Racing career summary ===
Season	Series	Team	Races	Wins	Top 5	Top 10	Points	Position
2019	CARS Late Model Stock Car Tour	Howard DiSavino	1	0	0	0	21	49th
2019	ARCA Menards Series	Win-Tron Racing	2	0	0	1	330	54th
2020	ARCA Menards Series West	Win-Tron Racing	1	0	0	0	33	25th
2020	ARCA Menards Series	Win-Tron Racing	3	0	0	1	86	38th
2021	ARCA Menards Series	AM Racing	1	0	0	0	31	94th
2021	NASCAR Camping World Truck Series	Jordan Anderson Racing	5	0	0	0	52	47th
2022	NASCAR Xfinity Series	Alpha Prime Racing	5	0	0	0	44	52nd

=== NASCAR ===
(key) (Bold – Pole position awarded by qualifying time. Italics – Pole position earned by points standings or practice time. * – Most laps led.)

==== Xfinity Series ====
NASCAR Xfinity Series results
Year	Driver	No.	Make	1	2	3	4	5	6	7	8	9	10	11	12	13	14	15	16	17	18	19	20	21	22	23	24	25	26	27	28	29	30	31	32	33	NXSC	Pts	Ref
2022	Alpha Prime Racing	45	Chevy	DAY	CAL	LVS	PHO	ATL	COA	RCH; DNQ																									MAR; 28	PHO	52nd	44	
2022	Alpha Prime Racing	44	Chevy								MAR; 36	TAL	DOV	DAR	TEX	CLT	PIR	NSH	ROA	ATL	NHA; 17	POC	IND	MCH	GLN	DAY	DAR	KAN; 28	BRI	TEX	TAL; 32	CLT	LVS	HOM			52nd	44	

==== Camping World Truck Series ====
NASCAR Camping World Truck Series results
Year	Team	No.	Make	1	2	3	4	5	6	7	8	9	10	11	12	13	14	15	16	17	18	19	20	21	22	NCWTC	Pts	Ref
2021	Jordan Anderson Racing	3	Chevy	DAY	DAY	LVS	ATL	BRI	RCH; 34	KAN	DAR	COA	CLT	TEX; 23	NSH	POC; 22	KNX	GLN	GTW	DAR	BRI; 28	LVS; 26	TAL	MAR	PHO	47th	52	

=== ARCA Menards Series ===
(key) (Bold – Pole position awarded by qualifying time. Italics – Pole position earned by points standings or practice time. * – Most laps led.)

ARCA Menards Series results
Year	Team	No.	Make	1	2	3	4	5	6	7	8	9	10	11	12	13	14	15	16	17	18	19	20	AMSC	Pts	Ref
2019	Win-Tron Racing	32	Chevy	DAY	FIF	SLM	TAL	NSH	TOL	CLT	POC	MCH	MAD	GTW	CHI	ELK; 10	IOW	POC	ISF	DSF	SLM	IRP; 16	KAN	54th	330	
2020	Win-Tron Racing	32	Chevy	DAY	PHO; 21	TAL	POC	IRP; 9	KEN	IOW; 16	KAN	TOL	TOL	MCH	DAY	GTW	L44	TOL	BRI	WIN	MEM	ISF	KAN	38th	86	
2021	AM Racing	32	Chevy	DAY; 13	PHO	TAL	KAN	TOL	CLT	MOH	POC	ELK	BLN	IOW	WIN	GLN	MCH	ISF	MLW	DSF	BRI	SLM	KAN	94th	31	

==== ARCA Menards Series West ====
ARCA Menards Series West results
Year	Team	No.	Make	1	2	3	4	5	6	7	8	9	10	11	AMSWC	Pts	Ref
2020	Win-Tron Racing	32	Chevy	LVS	MMP	MMP	IRW	EVG	DCS	CNS	LVS	AAS	KCR	PHO; 11	25th	33	

=== CARS Late Model Stock Car Tour ===
(key) (Bold – Pole position awarded by qualifying time. Italics – Pole position earned by points standings or practice time. * – Most laps led. ** – All laps led.)

CARS Late Model Stock Car Tour results
Year	Team	No.	Make	1	2	3	4	5	6	7	8	9	10	11	CLMSCTC	Pts	Ref
2019	Howard DiSavino	55	Chevy	SNM	HCY	ROU	ACE	MMS	LGY	DOM; 12	CCS	HCY	ROU	SBO	49th	21	
