= 2021 UNOH 200 =

2021 UNOH 200 presented by Ohio Logistics
Race details
- Race 18 of 22 of the 2021 NASCAR Camping World Truck Series
- Date: September 16, 2021
- Official name: UNOH 200 presented by Ohio Logistics
- Location: Bristol, Tennessee, Bristol Motor Speedway
- Course: Permanent racing facility
- Course length: 0.533 miles (0.858 km)
- Distance: 200 laps, 106.6 mi (171.6 km)
- Scheduled distance: 200 laps, 106.6 mi (171.6 km)
- Average speed: 59.479 miles per hour (95.722 km/h)

Pole position
Driver	Sheldon Creed	GMS Racing
- Grid positions set by competition-based formula

Most laps led
Driver	Sheldon Creed	GMS Racing
- Laps: 189

Winner
No. 18	Chandler Smith	Kyle Busch Motorsports

Television in the United States
- Network: Fox Sports 1
- Announcers: Vince Welch, Michael Waltrip, and Kurt Busch

Radio in the United States
- Radio: Motor Racing Network

The 2021 UNOH 200 presented by Ohio Logistics was the 18th stock car race of the 2021 NASCAR Camping World Truck Series, the 24th iteration of the event, and the final and thus cutoff race for the Round of 10 for the playoffs. The race was held on Thursday, September 16, 2021 in Bristol, Tennessee at Bristol Motor Speedway, a 0.533 miles (0.858 km) permanent oval racetrack. The race took 200 laps to complete. In a wild finish that saw multiple lead changes in the final laps of the race, Chandler Smith of Kyle Busch Motorsports would win his first ever race in the NASCAR Camping World Truck Series, after both Sheldon Creed, who had dominated the race, and John Hunter Nemechek had issues on the final restart. To fill in the rest of the podium positions, Grant Enfinger of ThorSport Racing and John Hunter Nemechek of Kyle Busch Motorsports would finish 2nd and 3rd, respectively.

The two drivers that were cut from the playoffs from this race were Austin Hill of Hattori Racing Enterprises and Todd Gilliland of Front Row Motorsports.

== Background ==
The layout of Bristol Motor Speedway, the venue where the race was held.

The Bristol Motor Speedway, formerly known as Bristol International Raceway and Bristol Raceway, is a NASCAR short track venue located in Bristol, Tennessee. Constructed in 1960, it held its first NASCAR race on July 30, 1961. Despite its short length, Bristol is among the most popular tracks on the NASCAR schedule because of its distinct features, which include extraordinarily steep banking, an all concrete surface, two pit roads, and stadium-like seating. It has also been named one of the loudest NASCAR tracks.

=== Entry list ===
#	Driver	Team	Make
1	Hailie Deegan	David Gilliland Racing	Ford
2	Sheldon Creed	GMS Racing	Chevrolet
02	Kris Wright	Young's Motorsports	Chevrolet
3	Howie DiSavino III	Jordan Anderson Racing	Chevrolet
4	John Hunter Nemechek	Kyle Busch Motorsports	Toyota
04	Cory Roper	Roper Racing	Ford
6	Norm Benning	Norm Benning Racing	Chevrolet
9	Colby Howard	CR7 Motorsports	Chevrolet
10	Jennifer Jo Cobb	Jennifer Jo Cobb Racing	Ford
11	Clay Greenfield	Spencer Davis Motorsports	Toyota
12	Tate Fogleman	Young's Motorsports	Chevrolet
13	Johnny Sauter	ThorSport Racing	Toyota
15	Tanner Gray	David Gilliland Racing	Ford
16	Austin Hill	Hattori Racing Enterprises	Toyota
17	Taylor Gray	Reaume Brothers Racing	Ford
18	Chandler Smith	Kyle Busch Motorsports	Toyota
19	Derek Kraus	McAnally–Hilgemann Racing	Toyota
20	Spencer Boyd	Young's Motorsports	Chevrolet
21	Zane Smith	GMS Racing	Chevrolet
22	Austin Wayne Self	AM Racing	Chevrolet
23	Chase Purdy	GMS Racing	Chevrolet
24	Doug Coby	GMS Racing	Chevrolet
25	Josh Berry	Rackley W.A.R.	Chevrolet
26	Tyler Ankrum	GMS Racing	Chevrolet
30	Danny Bohn	On Point Motorsports	Toyota
32	Sam Mayer	Bret Holmes Racing	Chevrolet
33	C. J. McLaughlin	Reaume Brothers Racing	Toyota
34	Josh Reaume	Reaume Brothers Racing	Toyota
38	Todd Gilliland	Front Row Motorsports	Ford
40	Ryan Truex	Niece Motorsports	Chevrolet
41	Dawson Cram	Cram Racing Enterprises	Chevrolet
42	Carson Hocevar	Niece Motorsports	Chevrolet
45	Lawless Alan	Niece Motorsports	Chevrolet
49	Ray Ciccarelli	CMI Motorsports	Ford
51	Drew Dollar	Kyle Busch Motorsports	Toyota
52	Stewart Friesen	Halmar Friesen Racing	Toyota
56	Timmy Hill	Hill Motorsports	Chevrolet
75	Parker Kligerman	Henderson Motorsports	Toyota
88	Matt Crafton	ThorSport Racing	Toyota
98	Grant Enfinger	ThorSport Racing	Toyota
99	Ben Rhodes	ThorSport Racing	Toyota
Official entry list

== Starting lineup ==
Qualifying was determined by a metric qualifying system based on the previous race, the 2021 In It To Win It 200 and owner's points. As a result, Sheldon Creed of GMS Racing won the pole.

Pos.	#	Driver	Team	Make
1	2	Sheldon Creed	GMS Racing	Chevrolet
2	4	John Hunter Nemechek	Kyle Busch Motorsports	Toyota
3	38	Todd Gilliland	Front Row Motorsports	Ford
4	88	Matt Crafton	ThorSport Racing	Toyota
5	52	Stewart Friesen	Halmar Friesen Racing	Toyota
6	98	Grant Enfinger	ThorSport Racing	Toyota
7	18	Chandler Smith	Kyle Busch Motorsports	Toyota
8	42	Carson Hocevar	Niece Motorsports	Chevrolet
9	21	Zane Smith	GMS Racing	Chevrolet
10	16	Austin Hill	Hattori Racing Enterprises	Toyota
11	99	Ben Rhodes	ThorSport Racing	Toyota
12	51	Drew Dollar	Kyle Busch Motorsports	Toyota
13	13	Johnny Sauter	ThorSport Racing	Toyota
14	75	Parker Kligerman	Henderson Motorsports	Toyota
15	19	Derek Kraus	McAnally–Hilgemann Racing	Toyota
16	22	Austin Wayne Self	AM Racing	Chevrolet
17	25	Josh Berry	Rackley W.A.R.	Chevrolet
18	26	Tyler Ankrum	GMS Racing	Chevrolet
19	23	Chase Purdy	GMS Racing	Chevrolet
20	9	Colby Howard	CR7 Motorsports	Chevrolet
21	15	Tanner Gray	David Gilliland Racing	Ford
22	30	Danny Bohn	On Point Motorsports	Toyota
23	1	Hailie Deegan	David Gilliland Racing	Ford
24	02	Kris Wright	Young's Motorsports	Chevrolet
25	45	Lawless Alan	Niece Motorsports	Chevrolet
26	40	Ryan Truex	Niece Motorsports	Chevrolet
27	20	Spencer Boyd	Young's Motorsports	Chevrolet
28	34	Josh Reaume	Reaume Brothers Racing	Toyota
29	41	Dawson Cram	Cram Racing Enterprises	Chevrolet
30	24	Doug Coby	GMS Racing	Chevrolet
31	12	Tate Fogleman	Young's Motorsports	Chevrolet
32	56	Timmy Hill	Hill Motorsports	Chevrolet
33	3	Howie DiSavino III	Jordan Anderson Racing	Chevrolet
34	11	Clay Greenfield	Spencer Davis Motorsports	Toyota
35	17	Taylor Gray	Reaume Brothers Racing	Ford
36	10	Jennifer Jo Cobb	Jennifer Jo Cobb Racing	Ford
37	04	Cory Roper	Roper Racing	Ford
38	33	C. J. McLaughlin	Reaume Brothers Racing	Toyota
39	32	Sam Mayer	Bret Holmes Racing	Chevrolet
40	49	Ray Ciccarelli	CMI Motorsports	Ford
Failed to qualify
41	6	Norm Benning	Norm Benning Racing	Chevrolet
Official starting lineup

== Race results ==
Stage 1 Laps:

Fin	#	Driver	Team	Make	Pts
1	2	Sheldon Creed	GMS Racing	Chevrolet	10
2	16	Austin Hill	Hattori Racing Enterprises	Toyota	9
3	88	Matt Crafton	ThorSport Racing	Toyota	8
4	21	Zane Smith	GMS Racing	Chevrolet	7
5	98	Grant Enfinger	ThorSport Racing	Toyota	6
6	42	Carson Hocevar	Niece Motorsports	Chevrolet	5
7	52	Stewart Friesen	Halmar Friesen Racing	Toyota	4
8	38	Todd Gilliland	Front Row Motorsports	Ford	3
9	26	Tyler Ankrum	GMS Racing	Chevrolet	2
10	13	Johnny Sauter	ThorSport Racing	Toyota	1

Stage 2 Laps:

Fin	#	Driver	Team	Make	Pts
1	2	Sheldon Creed	GMS Racing	Chevrolet	10
2	26	Tyler Ankrum	GMS Racing	Chevrolet	9
3	16	Austin Hill	Hattori Racing Enterprises	Toyota	8
4	21	Zane Smith	GMS Racing	Chevrolet	7
5	18	Chandler Smith	Kyle Busch Motorsports	Toyota	6
6	4	John Hunter Nemechek	Kyle Busch Motorsports	Toyota	5
7	52	Stewart Friesen	Halmar Friesen Racing	Toyota	4
8	98	Grant Enfinger	ThorSport Racing	Toyota	3
9	75	Parker Kligerman	Henderson Motorsports	Toyota	2
10	88	Matt Crafton	ThorSport Racing	Toyota	1

Stage 3 Laps:

Fin	St	#	Driver	Team	Make	Laps	Led	Status	Pts
1	7	18	Chandler Smith	Kyle Busch Motorsports	Toyota	200	5	running	46
2	6	98	Grant Enfinger	ThorSport Racing	Toyota	200	0	running	44
3	2	4	John Hunter Nemechek	Kyle Busch Motorsports	Toyota	200	0	running	39
4	5	52	Stewart Friesen	Halmar Friesen Racing	Toyota	200	0	running	41
5	13	13	Johnny Sauter	ThorSport Racing	Toyota	200	0	running	33
6	8	42	Carson Hocevar	Niece Motorsports	Chevrolet	200	6	running	36
7	4	88	Matt Crafton	ThorSport Racing	Toyota	200	0	running	39
8	9	21	Zane Smith	GMS Racing	Chevrolet	200	0	running	43
9	11	99	Ben Rhodes	ThorSport Racing	Toyota	200	0	running	28
10	3	38	Todd Gilliland	Front Row Motorsports	Ford	200	0	running	30
11	17	25	Josh Berry	Rackley W.A.R.	Chevrolet	200	0	running	0
12	30	24	Doug Coby	GMS Racing	Chevrolet	200	0	running	25
13	15	19	Derek Kraus	McAnally–Hilgemann Racing	Toyota	200	0	running	24
14	16	22	Austin Wayne Self	AM Racing	Chevrolet	200	0	running	23
15	20	9	Colby Howard	CR7 Motorsports	Chevrolet	200	0	running	0
16	26	40	Ryan Truex	Niece Motorsports	Chevrolet	200	0	running	21
17	32	56	Timmy Hill	Hill Motorsports	Chevrolet	200	0	running	20
18	25	45	Lawless Alan	Niece Motorsports	Chevrolet	200	0	running	19
19	1	2	Sheldon Creed	GMS Racing	Chevrolet	198	189	running	38
20	37	04	Cory Roper	Roper Racing	Ford	198	0	running	17
21	14	75	Parker Kligerman	Henderson Motorsports	Toyota	197	0	running	18
22	39	32	Sam Mayer	Bret Holmes Racing	Chevrolet	193	0	running	0
23	34	11	Clay Greenfield	Spencer Davis Motorsports	Toyota	193	0	running	14
24	10	16	Austin Hill	Hattori Racing Enterprises	Toyota	188	0	accident	30
25	23	1	Hailie Deegan	David Gilliland Racing	Ford	188	0	accident	12
26	38	33	C. J. McLaughlin	Reaume Brothers Racing	Toyota	188	0	running	11
27	36	10	Jennifer Jo Cobb	Jennifer Jo Cobb Racing	Ford	188	0	running	10
28	33	3	Howie DiSavino III	Jordan Anderson Racing	Chevrolet	169	0	electrical	9
29	35	17	Taylor Gray	Reaume Brothers Racing	Ford	156	0	accident	8
30	19	23	Chase Purdy	GMS Racing	Chevrolet	154	0	accident	7
31	27	20	Spencer Boyd	Young's Motorsports	Chevrolet	146	0	overheating	6
32	18	26	Tyler Ankrum	GMS Racing	Chevrolet	123	0	accident	16
33	22	30	Danny Bohn	On Point Motorsports	Toyota	70	0	accident	4
34	12	51	Drew Dollar	Kyle Busch Motorsports	Toyota	69	0	accident	3
35	29	41	Dawson Cram	Cram Racing Enterprises	Chevrolet	69	0	accident	2
36	24	02	Kris Wright	Young's Motorsports	Chevrolet	69	0	engine	1
37	31	12	Tate Fogleman	Young's Motorsports	Chevrolet	30	0	accident	1
38	21	15	Tanner Gray	David Gilliland Racing	Ford	21	0	accident	1
39	40	49	Ray Ciccarelli	CMI Motorsports	Ford	15	0	rear gear	1
40	28	34	Josh Reaume	Reaume Brothers Racing	Toyota	3	0	accident	1
Official race results

Previous race: 2021 In It To Win It 200	NASCAR Camping World Truck Series; 2021 season	Next race: 2021 Victoria's Voice Foundation 200
