= Empire Racing =

NASCAR team

Empire Racing Group
- Owner(s): John Corr, Sean Corr
- Base: Mooresville, North Carolina
- Series: ARCA Menards Series
- Race drivers: ARCA Menards Series: 8. Sean Corr
- Manufacturer: Chevrolet, Ford
- Opened: 2009 (ARCA); 2012 (Truck)

Career
- Debut: ARCA Menards Series: 2009 Drive Smart Buckle-Up Kentucky 150 (Kentucky); NASCAR Craftsman Truck Series: 2012 Pocono Mountains 125 (Pocono)

Empire Racing Group (often just called Empire Racing) is an American professional stock car racing team that currently competes in the ARCA Menards Series, fielding the No. 8 Chevrolet and Fords for driver Sean Corr and in late models with various drivers. They have also competed in the NASCAR Craftsman Truck Series in the past.

== History ==
=== NASCAR Gander RV & Outdoors Truck Series ===
The team fielded the No. 82 Ford F-150 part-time in the Truck Series starting in 2012. They made their debut at Pocono with Sean Corr driving, finishing 25th. The team attempted one more race at Homestead, but they failed to qualify.

Sean Corr made his first Truck starts at Daytona (which was a DNQ) and Talladega in 2013 as well as Pocono for the second straight year.

The team had other drivers in addition to Corr in 2014, with Jake Crum racing at Charlotte and dirt driver Cody Erickson attempting to qualify for Eldora. After he failed to qualify to the race after just coming short in the last-chance qualifier, the team invited him back for a pavement start at Martinsville that October, which he did qualify for.

Empire fielded K&N Series driver Austin Hill for four races in 2015 at Daytona, Dover, Talladega, and Martinsville. Corr made his first start at Eldora that year in the No. 82, with Erickson driving a second truck for the team, the No. 35, where the team leased owner points from Win-Tron Racing instead of fielding a separate truck of their own so Erickson could have a better chance of qualifying (which he successfully did). They did the same thing at Martinsville with Jim Weiler since Austin Hill was already in the No. 82, but Weiler did not qualify for what would have been his debut race in the Truck Series.

With the team allying with Richard Petty Motorsports starting in 2016, they switched to run the famous Petty No. 43 for their primary truck. Austin Hill returned to Empire at Daytona, where he did not qualify for the race, which had a large entry list of 43 trucks for just 32 spots. Hill was set to leave after that to form his team, the No. 20, so he did not run any more races for the team after that.

The team picked up Korbin Forrister to drive the No. 43 at Eldora, who was making his first Truck attempt after his team, the No. 59 for Lira Motorsports, closed down after just two races. The team entered a second truck for that race again this year, with the team bringing back their old number, the No. 82, for Sean Corr. Both Empire trucks failed to qualify for that race.

The team has not attempted any more Truck Series races since then, as they have focused on expanding their ARCA team back up to three cars.

==== Truck No. 35 results ====
| Year | Driver | No. | Make | 1 | 2 | 3 | 4 | 5 | 6 | 7 | 8 | 9 | 10 | 11 | 12 | 13 | 14 | 15 | 16 | 17 | 18 | 19 | 20 | 21 | 22 | 23 | Owners | Pts |
|---|---|---|---|---|---|---|---|---|---|---|---|---|---|---|---|---|---|---|---|---|---|---|---|---|---|---|---|---|
| 2015 | Cody Erickson | 35 | Chevy | DAY | ATL | MAR | KAN | CLT | DOV | TEX | GTW | IOW | KEN | ELD; 25 | POC | MCH | BRI | MSP | CHI | NHA | LVS | TAL | | | | | 45th | 50 |
| 2015 | Jim Weiler | 35 | Ford | | | | | | | | | | | | | | | | | | | | MAR; DNQ | TEX | PHO | HOM | 45th | 50 |

==== Truck No. 43 results ====
| Year | Driver | No. | Make | 1 | 2 | 3 | 4 | 5 | 6 | 7 | 8 | 9 | 10 | 11 | 12 | 13 | 14 | 15 | 16 | 17 | 18 | 19 | 20 | 21 | 22 | 23 | Owners | Pts |
|---|---|---|---|---|---|---|---|---|---|---|---|---|---|---|---|---|---|---|---|---|---|---|---|---|---|---|---|---|
| 2016 | Austin Hill | 43 | Ford | DAY; DNQ | ATL | MAR | KAN | DOV | CLT | TEX | IOW | GTW | KEN | | | | | | | | | | | | | | 51st | 0 |
| 2016 | Korbin Forrister | 43 | Ford | | | | | | | | | | | ELD; DNQ | POC | BRI | MCH | MSP | CHI | NHA | LVS | TAL | MAR | TEX | PHO | HOM | 51st | 0 |

==== Truck No. 82 results ====
| Year | Driver | No. | Make | 1 | 2 | 3 | 4 | 5 | 6 | 7 | 8 | 9 | 10 | 11 | 12 | 13 | 14 | 15 | 16 | 17 | 18 | 19 | 20 | 21 | 22 | 23 | Owners | Pts |
|---|---|---|---|---|---|---|---|---|---|---|---|---|---|---|---|---|---|---|---|---|---|---|---|---|---|---|---|---|
| 2012 | Sean Corr | 82 | Ford | DAY | MAR | CAR | KAN | CLT | DOV | TEX | KEN | IOW | CHI | POC; 25 | MCH | BRI | ATL | IOW | KEN | LVS | TAL | MAR | TEX | PHO | HOM; DNQ | | 58th | 19 |
| 2013 | Sean Corr | 82 | Ford | DAY; DNQ | MAR | CAR | KAN | CLT | DOV | TEX | KEN | IOW | ELD | POC; 26 | MCH | BRI | MSP | IOW | CHI | LVS | TAL; 33 | MAR | TEX | PHO | HOM | | 56th | 29 |
| 2014 | Sean Corr | 82 | Ford | DAY; 31 | MAR | KAN | | | | | | | | | | | | | | | | | | | | | 44th | 57 |
| 2014 | Jake Crum | 82 | Chevy | | | | CLT; 21 | DOV | TEX | GTW | KEN | IOW | | | | | | | | | | | | | | | 44th | 57 |
| 2014 | Cody Erickson | 82 | Chevy | | | | | | | | | | ELD; DNQ | POC | MCH | BRI | MSP | CHI | NHA | LVS | TAL | | | | | | 44th | 57 |
| 2014 | Cody Erickson | 82 | Ford | | | | | | | | | | | | | | | | | | | MAR; 23 | TEX | PHO | HOM | | 44th | 57 |
| 2015 | Austin Hill | 82 | Ford | DAY; 30 | ATL | MAR | KAN | CLT | DOV; 16 | TEX | GTW | IOW | KEN | | | | | | | | | TAL; 22 | MAR; 19 | TEX | PHO | HOM | 36th | 99 |
| 2015 | Sean Corr | 82 | Ford | | | | | | | | | | | ELD; 20 | POC | MCH | BRI | MSP | CHI | NHA | LVS | | | | | | 36th | 99 |
| 2016 | Sean Corr | 82 | Chevy | DAY | ATL | MAR | KAN | DOV | CLT | TEX | IOW | GTW | KEN | ELD; DNQ | POC | BRI | MCH | MSP | CHI | NHA | LVS | TAL | MAR | TEX | PHO | HOM | 56th | 0 |

=== ARCA Menards Series ===
==== 2009–2016 ====
The first series the team raced in was the ARCA Racing Series. Beginning in 2009, the team fielded the No. 82 Ford for Sean Corr part-time. In 2009, Corr attempted Kentucky, both races at Pocono (his home track) and Chicago.

For 2010, the team switched numbers for unknown reasons to the No. 83 at Daytona, but they used the No. 82 again for the rest of their attempts, which were at Texas, Talladega, Michigan, and both Pocono races again with Corr and New Jersey Motorsports Park with road course ringer Robert Mitten.

In 2011, Corr ran for rookie of the year in ARCA and the No. 82 team ran full-time for the first time. Corr finished ninth in points and scored two top-tens at Iowa and Madison. Former driver Richard Johns was announced to serve as the team's crew chief that year.

Corr started the 2012 season with a bang by winning the pole for the season opener at Daytona after Bobby Gerhart's time was disqualified. However, they finished last because of engine issues. Due to sponsorship, the team announced they had to cut back to part-time after four races, and they only ran the first race at Pocono for the remainder of that year. After just that race, they decided to focus their attention on the Truck Series.

The team returned to ARCA at Daytona, Talladega, and Pocono in 2013. Corr got the team's first top-5 finish at Daytona. Empire did not attempt any more races until the second Pocono race, where rookie Mason Mitchell drove the No. 82 after he was released from Roulo Brothers Racing. The team would run the rest of the races with Mitchell in his quest for rookie of the year.

In 2014, the team fielded two cars at Daytona with Canadian Cole Powell driving the No. 8 (switching numbers from the No. 82) and Sean Corr in the No. 48 for the team in a partnership with James Hylton Motorsports. The only other ARCA race Empire ran in 2014 was at Salem in September with Cody Erickson, who drove for the team at the Truck race at Eldora earlier in the year.

They brought three cars to Daytona in 2015. Austin Hill and Patrick Staropoli each made their ARCA debuts in the No. 8 and 82 cars, respectfully, and Corr returned to the No. 48 with the alliance with Hylton's team.

For the third year in a row, Corr drove at Daytona in the No. 48. Empire Racing entered one other car, the No. 82, for Dylan Lupton, who was without a ride at the start of the season after driving in the Xfinity Series part-time the year before. For the rest of the year, the team teamed with James Hylton Motorsports for additional races at Nashville, IRP, and Chicago with Dylan Martin as well as Sean Corr running Talladega and the first Pocono race for the first time in three years.

==== 2017–present ====
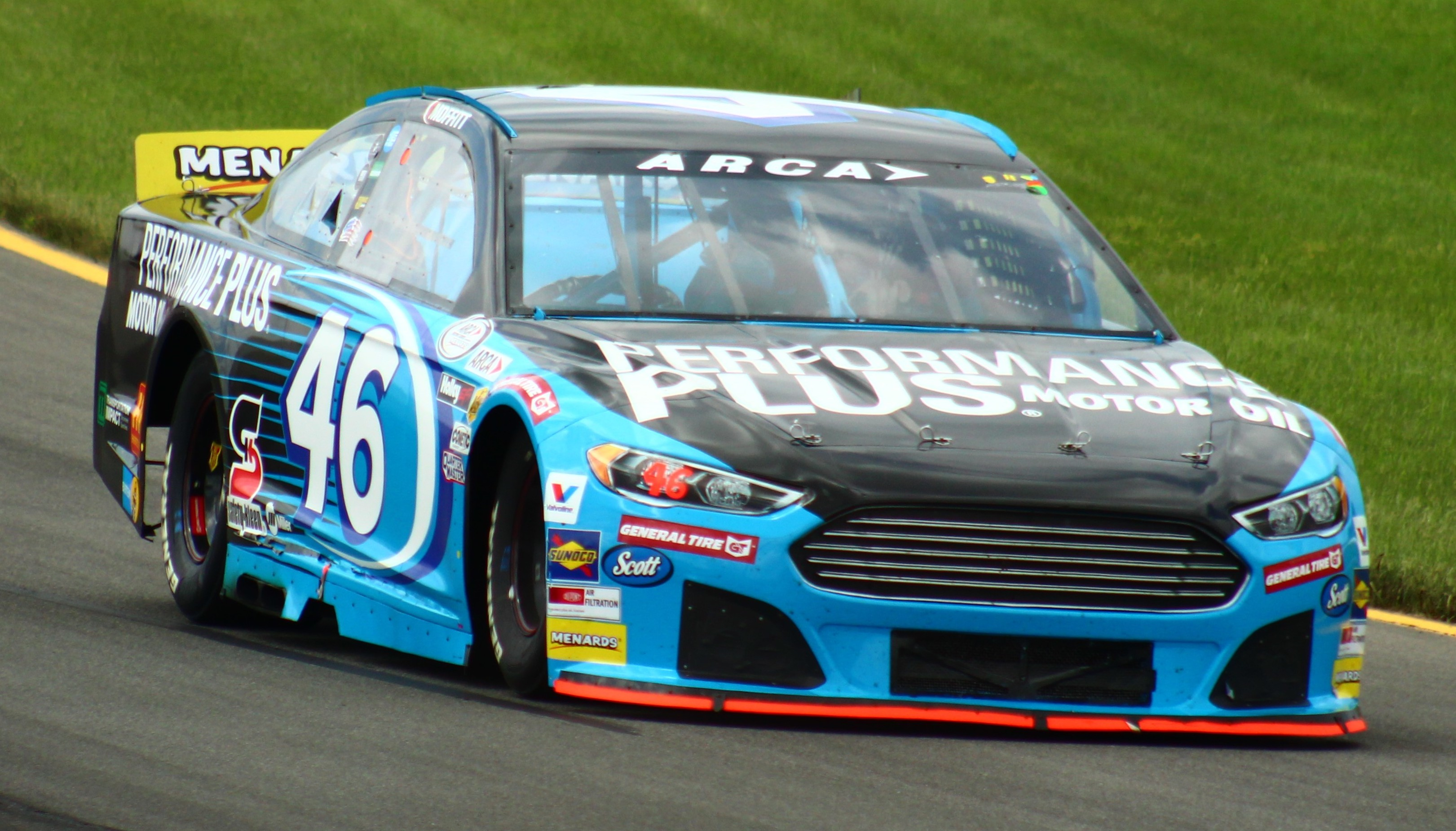
Thad Moffitt driving his No. 46 at Pocono in 2018.

The team's main car in 2017 was the No. 46, which Corr drove at Daytona. Thad Moffitt, Richard Petty's great-grandson, made his ARCA debut in the car for three races at Nashville, Toledo, and IRP. John Ferrier, who is from Middletown, New York (not far from Goshen, where the Corr family is from), joined the team and merged it with his own. He drove the No. 46 at both Pocono races.

Ferrier returned to the No. 46 for Daytona in 2018. Kaden Honeycutt made his first two series starts for Empire at Salem and IRP driving the No. 43, a second car to the No. 46. Corr also drove the No. 43 at his usual starts at Daytona and Pocono. He ran Talladega in the No. 46.

Towards the end of the 2018 season, the team purchased Chevrolet's from the closed Mason Mitchell Motorsports team. They had been trying to switch over their fleet of cars to Chevrolets since Richard Petty Motorsports had already switched from Ford to Chevrolet for their Cup team. In some races, such as Pocono in June, the team had to run their Fords unbadged (in other words, with the Ford logo covered up) due to RPM's manufacturer change.

The team expanded back to three cars for Daytona for the first time since 2015, with the team entering the No. 43 for Corr, the No. 44 (another Petty number) for Ferrier, and the No. 46 for Moffitt, who turned 18 and was now eligible to run Daytona. The team's late model driver, Lexi Gay, attempted Nashville in the No. 44. Moffitt and the No. 46 team attempted six more races that year (plus withdrawing from three others).

ThePitLane.com reported in November 2019 that there were rumors Empire may be leaving ARCA for the NASCAR Xfinity Series starting in 2020. An image of Gay's No. 44 car from the Nashville race in 2019 is for sale on RacingJunk.com, which ThePitLane claims has been on there for months.

Thad Moffitt was announced to be driving a car for DGR-Crosley at Daytona in February instead of with Empire. The team filed an entry for Daytona with Corr driving a No. 8 car (one of the team's old numbers before they partnered with Petty). Also, as per the Daytona entry list, John Ferrier appears to have restarted his team this season instead of driving with Empire.
