= Cram Racing Enterprises =

NASCAR team

- Owner(s): Clinton Cram; Dawson Cram; Kevin Cram; Mark Cram
- Base: Mooresville, North Carolina
- Series: NASCAR Xfinity Series; NASCAR Camping World Truck Series; ARCA Menards Series
- Race drivers: Xfinity Series: 35. Dawson Cram; Truck Series: 41. Dawson Cram; ARCA Menards Series: 94. TBA
- Manufacturer: Ford; Chevrolet; Toyota
- Opened: 2017

Career
- Debut: Xfinity Series: TBA; Truck Series: 2017 Texas Roadhouse 200; ARCA Menards Series: 2021 Lucas Oil 200; ARCA Menards Series West: 2020 Arizona Lottery 100
- Latest race: Xfinity Series: TBA; Truck Series: 2021 Lucas Oil 150; ARCA Menards Series: 2021 General Tire 150; ARCA Menards Series West: 2020 Arizona Lottery 100
- Races competed: Total: 40; Xfinity Series: 0 Truck Series: 36; ARCA Menards Series: 3 ARCA Menards Series West: 1
- Drivers' Championships: Total: 0 Xfinity Series: 0 Truck Series: 0 ARCA Menards Series: 0 ARCA Menards Series West: 0
- Race victories: Total: 0 Xfinity Series: 0 Truck Series: 0 ARCA Menards Series: 0 ARCA Menards Series West: 0
- Pole positions: Xfinity Series: 0 Truck Series: 0 ARCA Menards Series: 0 ARCA Menards Series West: 0

Cram Racing Enterprises (formerly in partnership with Long Motorsports) was an American professional stock car racing team that competed in the NASCAR Xfinity Series, NASCAR Camping World Truck Series, and ARCA Menards Series. In the NASCAR Xfinity Series they fielded the No. 35 Ford Mustang part-time for Dawson Cram, in the NASCAR Camping World Truck Series they fielded the No. 41 Chevrolet Silverado part-time for Dawson Cram, and in the ARCA Menards Series they fielded the No. 94 Toyota Camry part-time for Bryce Haugeberg.

== History ==
The team existed since the start of Cram’s racing career in 2007 and fielded his cars in Dwarf Cars, Bandolero’s, Legend Car’s, Pro Truck’s, and Late Model Stock Car’s in addition to his racing in the National Touring Series of the NASCAR Xfinity Series, NASCAR Camping World Truck Series, and ARCA Menards Series.

=== ARCA Menards Series ===
==== 2020 ====
In a partnership with Fast Track Racing, Cram Racing Enterprises would make their debut in the ARCA Menards Series West in the 2020 season-finale at Phoenix with Erickson in the No. 10 Chevrolet and Chris Hacker in the No. 12 Toyota. Hacker joined the team to make one start in 2020.

==== 2021 ====
The team would return to run the 2021 season-opener at Daytona as well as at Talladega with Benny Chastain piloting their No. 94 entry to 20th and 21st place finishes, respectively. They had also ran the annual test with Alex Sedgwick, Dawson Cram, and Bryce Haugeberg.

At Charlotte the team tabbed Chris Hacker to drive the car. Hacker was originally supposed to drive at Daytona, but was forced to sit out after missing the winter test due to contracting COVID-19. He would end up coming home in 10th, the team and driver's first ever top 10 in the series.

==== 2022 ====
Bryce Haugeberg would attempt the 2022 season-opener with his own team, Haugeberg Racing, with CRE's No. 94 and a partnership with Cram Racing Enterprises. He was also entered in Talladega.

==== ARCA Menards Series Results ====
ARCA Menards Series results
Year	Team	No.	Make	1	2	3	4	5	6	7	8	9	10	11	12	13	14	15	16	17	18	19	20	AMSC	Pts
2021	Benny Chastain	94	Toyota	DAY; 20	PHO	TAL; 21	KAN	TOL	CLT		POC	ELK	BLN	IOW	WIN	GLN	MCH	ISF	MLW	DSF	BRI	SLM	KAN		
2021	Chris Hacker	94	Toyota							CLT; 10															
2022	Bryce Haugeberg	94	Toyota	DAY; 33	PHO	TAL; 18	KAN	CLT	IOW	BLN	ELK	MOH	POC	IRP	MCH	GLN	ISF	MLW	DSF	KAN	BRI	SLM	TOL		

=== Truck Series ===
==== 2017 ====
In 2017, then 15-year-old Dawson Cram entered the 2017 Texas Roadhouse 200 driving the No. 11 Chevrolet Silverado but would later lose a motor in practice and would not attempt a race with the team again until 2020.

==== 2020 ====
In 2020, Cram announced he would be returning and competing at Charlotte with Long Motorsports in the No. 55. The team would then go on to attempt five more races that season, but on August 13, 2020, Cram announced that he was immediately parting ways with Long Motorsports, who would announce that they were looking for a driver to replace Cram for the rest of the season (although Cram would end up running one more race for them at Dover). Shortly after that however, Long's plans changed once again, as it was announced on August 25 that Cram and his family had bought Long Motorsports, making it their team, Cram Racing Enterprises. The first race for the team under the new ownership was at Gateway, with Dawson Cram piloting the renumbered No. 41 truck.

The No. 41 would be entered in the remaining 10 races in 2020, and Dawson Cram would drive it 8 of those, earning a best finish of 16th at Martinsville in October. In the two races where Cram was not the driver, Fast Track Racing ARCA Menards Series driver Ryan Huff drove it at his home track of Richmond for his second start in the series, and Cody Erickson would drive at Bristol in his first Truck Series start in five years.

==== 2021 ====
In 2021 Cram tried to attempt the full 23-race schedule but would end up only attempting 16 races making the field 13 of those times with a best finish of 17th at the Daytona Road Course, he would still attempt the full schedule however fielding his Truck for other drivers such as Cody Erickson, Will Rodgers, Keith McGee, and Todd Peck getting a best finish of 10th with Keith McGee at Talladega, the team and drivers first top 10 in the series.

==== 2022 ====
In 2022 the team planned to do the full season with Dawson Cram in the No. 41 Chevrolet Silverado but ceased operations.

==== Truck No. 41 results ====
Year	Driver	No.	Make	1	2	3	4	5	6	7	8	9	10	11	12	13	14	15	16	17	18	19	20	21	22	23	NCTC	Pts
2017	Ted Minor	14	Chevy	DAY	ATL	MAR	KAN	DOV	CLT	TEX	IOW; 27	GTW	KEN	ELD	POC	BRI	MCH	MSP	CHI; 26	NHA	LVS	TAL	MAR	TEX	PHO	HOM	48th	21
2020	Dawson Cram	55	Chevy	DAY	LVS	CLT; DNQ	ATL; DNQ	HOM; 32	POC	KEN; 28	TEX	KAN	KAN	MCH; 14	DRC	DOV; 25											36th	158
2020	Dawson Cram	41	Chevy														GTW; 22	DAR; 33			LVS; 35	TAL; 35	KAN; 23	TEX; 18	MAR; 16	PHO; 28	36th	158
2020	Ryan Huff	41	Chevy																RCH; 28								36th	158
2020	Cody Erickson	41	Chevy																	BRI; 30							36th	158
2021	Dawson Cram	41	Chevy	DAY; DNQ	DRC; 17	LVS; 21	ATL; 31		RCH; 25	KAN; 31	DAR; 31	COA; DNQ	CLT; 21	TEX; 21	NSH; 28				GTW; 30	DAR; 23	BRI; 35	LVS		MAR; 23	PHO; DNQ		37th	206
2021	Cody Erickson	41	Chevy					BRI; 26									KNX; 22										37th	206
2021	Todd Peck	41	Chevy													POC; 29											37th	206
2021	Will Rodgers	41	Chevy															GLN; 39									37th	206
2021	Keith McGee	41	Toyota																				TAL; 10				37th	206

=== Xfinity Series ===
==== 2022 ====
On August 29, 2022, Cram was announced to run the No. 35 car for Emerling-Gase Motorsports in a partnership with his own team CRE and sponsorship from Be Water.
