= Central Coast Racing =

American stock car racing team

- Owner(s): Todd Souza; Kelly Souza
- Base: Visalia, California
- Series: ARCA Menards Series; ARCA Menards Series West
- Race drivers: ARCA Menards Series: 13. TBA; ARCA Menards Series West: 13. TBA
- Manufacturer: Toyota; Ford
- Opened: 2007
- Website: centralcoastracing.net

Career
- Debut: NASCAR Busch Series: 2007 Telcel-Motorola Mexico 200 (Mexico City); ARCA Menards Series: 2021 General Tire 150 (Phoenix); ARCA Menards Series West: 2006 Blue Lizard Australian Suncream 200 (Sonoma)
- Latest race: NASCAR Busch Series: 2007 Arizona Travel 200 (Phoenix); ARCA Menards Series: 2025 General Tire 150 (Phoenix); ARCA Menards Series West: 2026 NAPA Auto Parts 150 (Bakersfield)
- Drivers' Championships: Total: 0 NASCAR Busch Series: 0 ARCA Menards Series: 0 ARCA Menards Series West: 0
- Race victories: Total: 4 NASCAR Busch Series: 0 ARCA Menards Series: 0 ARCA Menards Series West: 4
- Pole positions: Total: 5 NASCAR Busch Series: 0 ARCA Menards Series: 0 ARCA Menards Series West: 5

Central Coast Racing is an American stock car racing team that competes in the ARCA and Menards Series West. The team was founded in 2007 and they field the No. 13 part-time for multiple drivers.

== Busch Series ==
=== Car No. 13 history ===
After not entering any races in 2006, Todd Souza returned to the Busch Series in 2007, again at Mexico City, but now using the No. 13, his West Series car number. Unlike two years earlier, he made the field this time. After finishing a solid 23rd in his debut, he attempted one other race that year, Phoenix in November, where he successfully qualified for the race but crashed out and finished fortieth. That race is his last start in the series to date.

==== Car No. 13 results ====
Year	Team	No.	Make	1	2	3	4	5	6	7	8	9	10	11	12	13	14	15	16	17	18	19	20	21	22	23	24	25	26	27	28	29	30	31	32	33	34	35	NBSC	Pts
2007	Todd Souza	13	Chevy	DAY	CAL	MXC; 23	LVS	ATL	BRI	NSH	TEX	PHO	TAL	RCH	DAR	CLT	DOV	NSH	KEN	MLW	NHA	DAY	CHI	GTY	IRP	CGV	GLN	MCH	BRI	CAL	RCH	DOV	KAN	CLT	MEM	TEX	PHO; 40	HOM	117th	137

=== Car No. 97 history ===
Todd Souza attempted to make his debut in the NASCAR Busch Series (now the Xfinity Series) in 2005 at the series' inaugural race at the Autódromo Hermanos Rodríguez road course in Mexico City. Fielding his own No. 97 Chevrolet, Souza failed to qualify. He returned later that year at the other road course on the schedule, Watkins Glen, and did not qualify again.

==== Car No. 97 results ====
Year	Team	No.	Make	1	2	3	4	5	6	7	8	9	10	11	12	13	14	15	16	17	18	19	20	21	22	23	24	25	26	27	28	29	30	31	32	33	34	35	NBSC	Pts
2005	Todd Souza	97	Chevy	DAY	CAL	MXC; DNQ	LVS	ATL	NSH	BRI	TEX	PHO	TAL	DAR	RCH	CLT	DOV	NSH	KEN	MLW	DAY	CHI	NHA	PPR	GTY	IRP	GLN; DNQ	MCH	BRI	CAL	RCH	DOV	KAN	CLT	MEM	TEX	PHO	HOM	N/A	0

== K&N Pro Series East ==
NASCAR K&N Pro Series East results
Year	Team	No.	Make	1	2	3	4	5	6	7	8	9	10	11	12	13	14	NKNPSEC	Pts
2005	Todd Souza	13	Chevy	STA	HOL	ERI	NHA	WFD	ADI	STA	DUB	OXF	NHA	DOV	LRP; 16	TMP		54th	115
2006	Todd Souza	13	Chevy	GRE	STA	HOL	TMP	ERI	NHA	ADI	WFD	NHA	DOV	LRP; 16				51st	115
2010	Todd Souza	13	Chevy	GRE	SBO	IOW; DNQ	MAR	NHA	LRP	LEE	GRE	NHA	DOV					N/A	0
2015	Todd Souza	13	Toyota	NSM	GRE	BRI	IOW	BGS	LGY	COL	NHA	IOW	GLN; 20	MOT	VIR	RCH	DOV	56th	24

== ARCA Menards Series ==
=== Car No. 3 results ===
ARCA Menards Series results
Year	Team	No.	Make	1	2	3	4	5	6	7	8	9	10	11	12	13	14	15	16	17	18	19	20	AMSC	Pts
2024	Todd Souza	3	Toyota	DAY	PHO; 19	TAL	DOV	KAN	CLT	IOW	MOH; Wth	BLN	IRP	SLM	ELK	MCH	ISF	MLW	DSF	GLN	BRI	KAN	TOL	64th	25
2025	Adrián Ferrer	3	Toyota	DAY	PHO; 18	TAL	KAN	CLT	MCH	BLN	ELK	LRP	DOV	IRP	IOW	GLN	ISF	MAD	DSF	BRI	SLM	KAN	TOL	64th	26

=== Car No. 13 results ===
ARCA Menards Series results
Year	Team	No.	Make	1	2	3	4	5	6	7	8	9	10	11	12	13	14	15	16	17	18	19	20	AMSC	Pts
2021	Todd Souza	13	Ford	DAY	PHO; 8	TAL	KAN	TOL	CLT	MOH	POC	ELK	BLN	IOW	WIN	GLN	MCH	ISF	MLW	DSF	BRI	SLM	KAN	48th	36
2022	Todd Souza	13	Ford	DAY	PHO; 12	TAL	KAN	CLT	IOW	BLN	ELK	MOH	POC	IRP	MCH	GLN	ISF	MLW	DSF	KAN	BRI	SLM	TOL	56th	32
2023	Todd Souza	13	Ford	DAY	PHO; 11	TAL	KAN	CLT	BLN	ELK	MOH; 7	IOW	POC	MCH	IRP	GLN	ISF	MLW	DSF	KAN	BRI	SLM	TOL	40th	70
2024	Tyler Reif	13	Toyota	DAY	PHO; 11	TAL	DOV	KAN	CLT	IOW	MOH	BLN	IRP	SLM	ELK	MCH	ISF	MLW	DSF	GLN	BRI	KAN	TOL	56th	33
2025	Tanner Reif	13	Toyota	DAY	PHO; 13	TAL	KAN	CLT	MCH	BLN	ELK	LRP	DOV	IRP	IOW	GLN	ISF	MAD	DSF	BRI	SLM	KAN	TOL	60th	31
2026	Taylor Reimer	13	Toyota	DAY	PHO; 32	KAN	TAL	GLN	TOL	MCH	POC	BER	ELK	CHI	LRP	IRP	IOW	ISF	MAD	DSF	SLM	BRI	KAN	-*	-*

== ARCA Menards Series West ==
=== Car No. 3 history ===
In 2022, in an ARCA website interview, Todd Souza talked about going part-time with a second car for his team and having the No. 13 running full time with another driver. In 2023 at Shasta Speedway, the No. 3 would make its first debut with Todd behind the wheel, with Tyler Reif driving the No. 13.

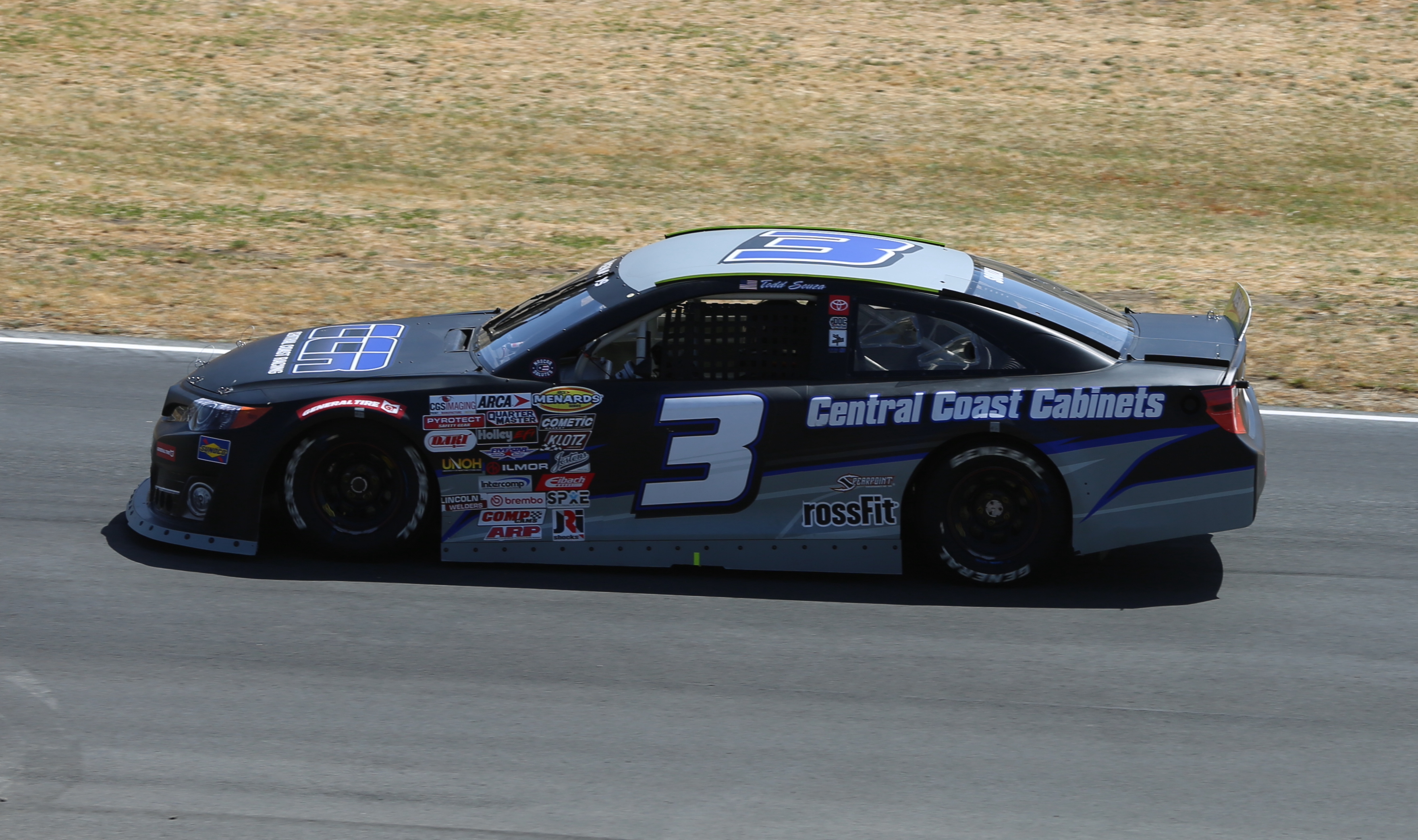
Souza's No. 3 car at Sonoma Raceway in 2024

Although Souza did return for another full season in 2023, which he confirmed would be his final season as a driver, he and his team did debut a second part-time car, the No. 3, at Shasta with him driving that car and Tyler Reif driving his No. 13 car in that race.

On January 3, 2024, it was announced that Reif would run full-time in the No. 13 car in 2024, with Souza returning to the series part-time in the No. 3 car. He would end up running full-time in the No. 3, with the exception of the race at All American Speedway, where Kyle Keller drove the No. 3 instead.

In 2025, Souza would return to the No. 3 car at Tucson Speedway, where he led the most laps and finished eighth.

==== Car. No. 3 results ====
ARCA Menards Series West results
Year	Team	No.	Make	1	2	3	4	5	6	7	8	9	10	11	12	13	14	AMSW	Pts
2017	Todd Souza	3	Toyota	TUS	KCR	IRW	IRW	SPO	OSS	CNS	SON	IOW; 18	EVG	DCS	MER	AAS	KCR	6th	468
2023	Todd Souza	3	Ford	PHO	IRW	KCR	PIR	SON	IRW	SHA; 10	EVG; 10	AAS; 5	LVS; 7	MAD; 2	PHO; 26			6th	503
2024	Todd Souza	3	Toyota	PHO; 19	KER; 9	PIR; 22	SON; 29	IRW; 10	IRW; 7	SHA; 7	TRI; 4	MAD; 11		KER; 12	PHO; 14			9th	390
2024	Kyle Keller	3	Toyota										AAS; 10					9th	390
2025	Adrián Ferrer	3	Toyota	KER; 7	PHO; 18													10th	420
2025	Todd Souza	3	Toyota			TUC; 8*	CNS; 7	KER; 13	SON; 23	TRI; 8		AAS; 11	MAD; 11	LVS	PHO			10th	420
2025	Fernando Navarette	3	Toyota								PIR; 16							10th	420

=== Car No. 13 history ===
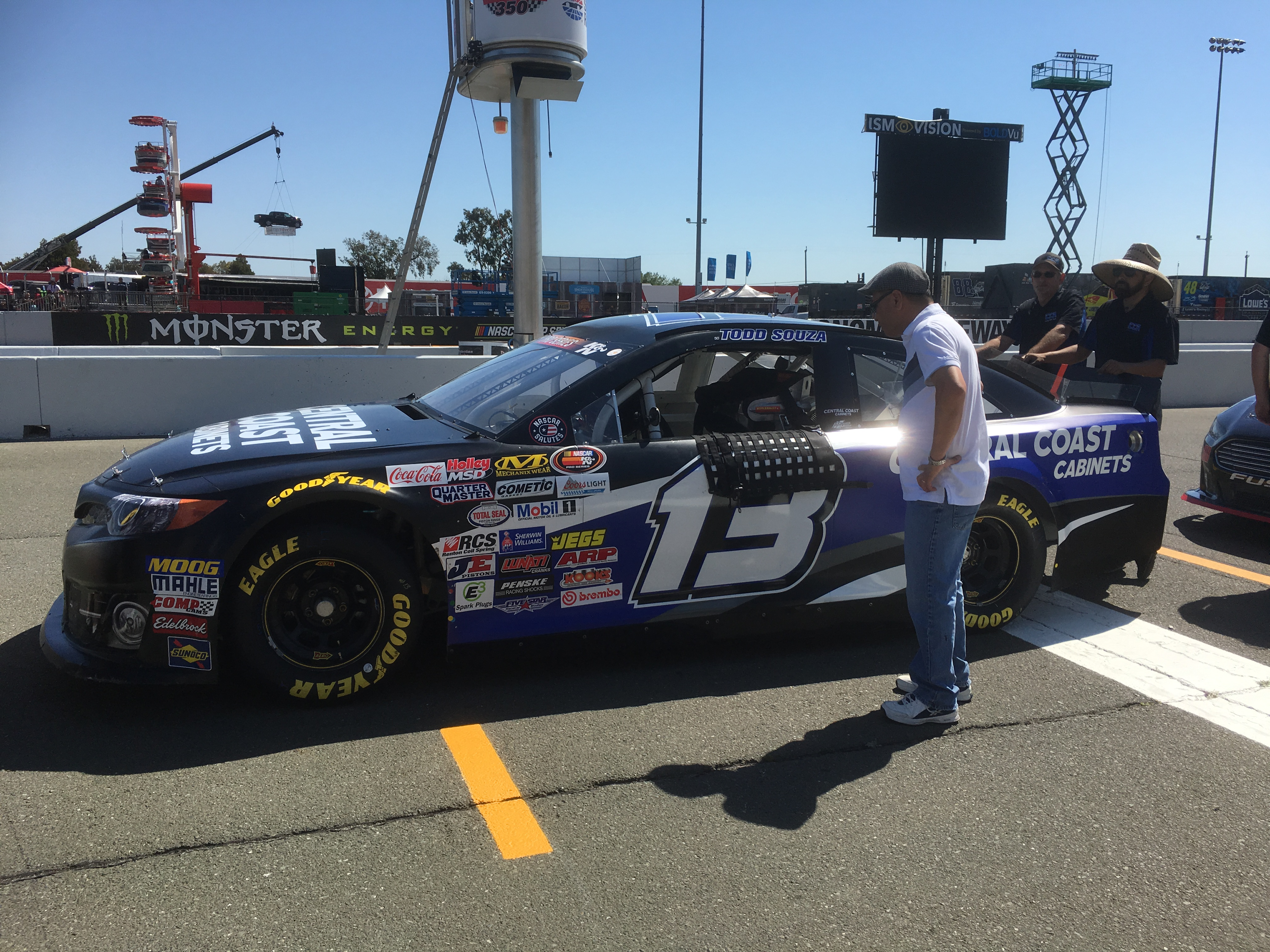
Todd Souza's No. 13 car at Sonoma Raceway in 2017

Souza has competed in NASCAR's West Series since 2006. He has one career win in the series, coming at Miller Motorsports Park in Utah in 2008. He completed his first full-time season in 2017 before scaling back to part-time for the 2018 season.

Souza's 2019 season was highlighted by two top-three finishes: a third-place run at Colorado National Speedway (his first podium in two years) and a runner-up finish at Meridian Speedway. He also made headlines at Gateway after on-track contact with Hailie Deegan, calling her "spoiled and rotten" and deeming her move "disrespectful."

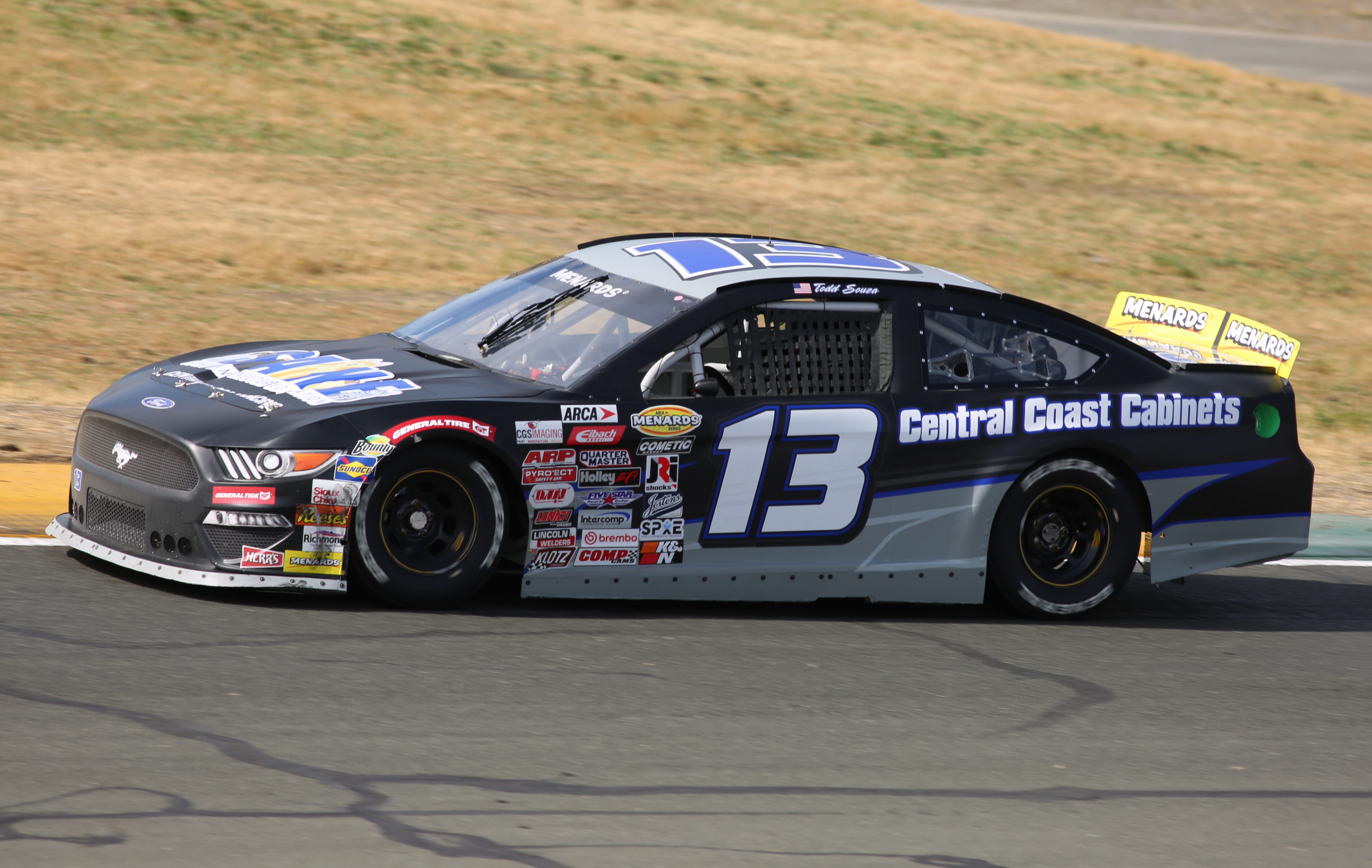
Todd Souza's No. 13 car at Sonoma Raceway in 2023

On April 14, 2022, Souza stated in an interview for the ARCA website that he might only run part-time in the West Series in 2023 in a new second car for his own team with someone else replacing him in his No. 13 car full-time.

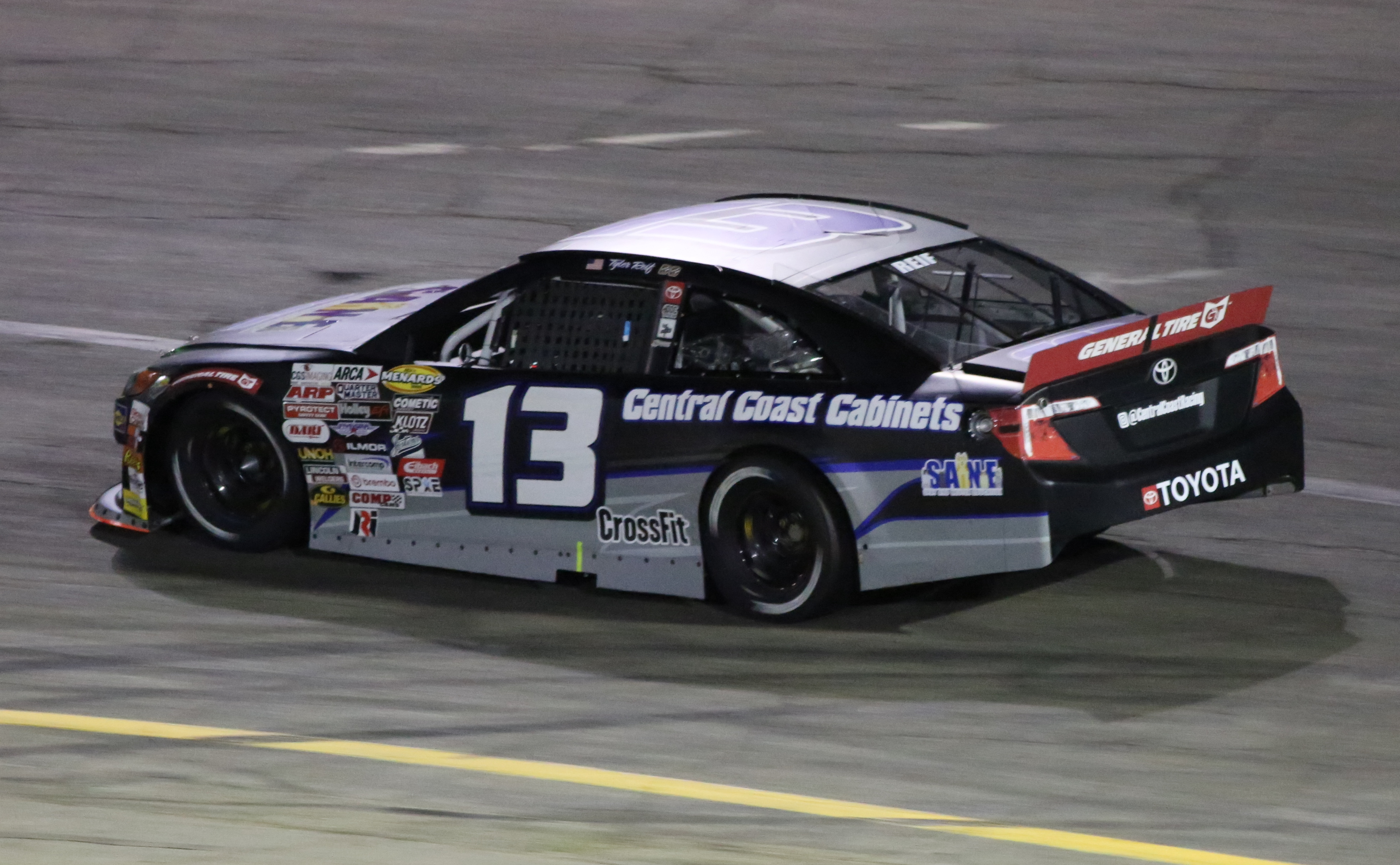
Reif's No. 13 car at All American Speedway in 2024

In 2024, CCR would switch car manufacturers from Ford to Toyota. Tyler Reif was announced to race full-time in the No. 13 for CCR that year with Michael Muñoz as his crew chief. Tyler would go on to win the team's second win at Shasta Speedway after leading every lap of the race. He would take the team back-to-back in wins after winning the next race at Tri-City Raceway. He finished second in points in the series that year.

In 2025, Tyler's brother Tanner Reif would be announced to race full-time in the No. 13 for CCR that year. Muñoz would stay as the crew chief for the 13. Tanner would garner his third career win at Tucson, after saving his tires late in the race. For reasons still unknown, Tanner would race his final race with Central Coast Racing at The Bullring at Las Vegas Motor Speedway. Jade Avedisian made her second start in the ARCA Menards Series West by filling in for Tanner at the final race at Phoenix Raceway.

2026 for CCR would bring in driver Sean Hingorani back to the driver seat after a long absence in the ARCA Menards Series at Kevin Harvick's Kern Raceway. Jade Avedisian would return to the drivers seat of the No. 13 as well to race both Tucson Speedway and Tri-City Raceway. Todd Souza would also make an additional two returns at both road courses in the No. 13 at Sonoma Raceway and Portland International Raceway. Kenna Mitchell would make her ARCA Menards Series West debut with CCR in the No. 13 at four events at Shasta Speedway, All American Speedway, Madera Speedway and Kevin Harvick's Kern Raceway.

==== Car No. 13 results ====
ARCA Menards Series West results
Year	Team	No.	Make	1	2	3	4	5	6	7	8	9	10	11	12	13	14	AMSW	Pts
2006	Todd Souza	13	Chevy	PHO	PHO; DNQ	S99	IRW	SON; 6	DCS	IRW; 12	EVG	S99	CAL; 17	CTS	AMP			26th	414
2007	Todd Souza	13	Chevy	CTS	PHO; 7	AMP	ELK	IOW	CNS	SON; 14	DCS	IRW	MMP; 15	EVG	CSR; 18	AMP		25th	499
2008	Todd Souza	13	Chevy	AAS	PHO	CTS	IOW	CNS	SON; 35	IRW	DCS	EVG	MMP; 1	IRW	AMP; 25	AAS; 4		23rd	491
2009	Todd Souza	13	Chevy	CTS	AAS	PHO; 12	MAD	IOW	DCS	SON; 6	IRW	PIR; 8	MMP; 7	CNS	IOW	AAS		21st	570
2010	Todd Souza	13	Chevy	AAS; 10		IOW; DNQ	DCS; 7	SON; 6	IRW; 28	PIR; 13	MRP; 10	CNS; 8	MMP; 12	AAS; 21				9th	1496
2010	Todd Souza	13	Toyota		PHO; 8										PHO; 14			9th	1496
2011	Todd Souza	13	Toyota	PHO; 16	AAS	MMP	IOW	LVS										32nd	472
2011	Todd Souza	13	Chevy						SON; 10	IRW	EVG	PIR; 23	CNS	MRP	SPO	AAS	PHO; 13	32nd	472
2014	Todd Souza	13	Chevy	PHO	IRW	S99	IOW	KCR	SON; 11	SLS	CNS	IOW	EVG	KCR	MMP; 12	AAS	PHO	37th	65
2015	Todd Souza	13	Toyota	KCR	IRW; 25	TUS; 16	IOW	SHA								PHO; 17		26th	84
2015	Todd Souza	13	Ford						SON; 34	SLS	IOW	EVG	CNS	MER	AAS			26th	84
2016	Todd Souza	13	Toyota	IRW; 24	KCR	TUS	OSS	CNS	SON; 16	SLS	IOW	EVG	DCS	MMP; 11	MMP; 5	MER	AAS	22nd	120
2017	Todd Souza	13	Toyota	TUS; 22	KCR; 10	IRW; 11	IRW; 10	SPO; 12	OSS; 3	CNS; 10	SON; 8	IOW	EVG; 8	DCS; 8	MER; 4	AAS; 11	KCR; 13	6th	468
2018	Todd Souza	13	Toyota	KCR; 22	TUS; 10	TUS; 14	OSS; 8	CNS; 12	SON; 19	DCS; Wth	IOW	EVG; 12	GTW	LVS; 18	MER	AAS	KCR; 9	10th	272
2019	Todd Souza	13	Toyota	LVS; 5	IRW; 11	TUS; 8	TUS; 16	CNS; 3	SON; 27	DCS; 7	IOW; 16	EVG; 6	GTW; 10	MER; 2	AAS; 5	KCR; 5	PHO; 9	6th	486
2020	Todd Souza	13	Toyota	LVS; 8	MMP; 6	MMP; 6	IRW; 7	EVG; 7	DCS; 11	CNS; 8	LVS; 5	AAS; 2	KCR; 7	PHO; 17				6th	550
2021	Todd Souza	13	Ford	PHO; 8	SON; 5							PHO; 16						7th	410
2021	Todd Souza	13	Toyota			IRW; 7	CNS; 7	IRW; 7	PIR; 17	LVS; 16	AAS; 4							7th	410
2022	Todd Souza	13	Ford	PHO; 12	IRW; 9	KCR; 6			IRW; 10	EVG; 5		AAS; 4	LVS; 10	PHO; 5				4th	563
2022	Todd Souza	13	Toyota				PIR; 3	SON; 8			PIR; 2							4th	563
2023	Todd Souza	13	Ford	PHO; 11	IRW; 11	KCR; 9	PIR; 22	SON; 8	IRW; 4										
2023	Tyler Reif	13	Ford							SHA; 14	EVG; 2	AAS; 13							
2023	Tyler Reif	13	Toyota										LVS; 4	MAD; 11	PHO; 5				
2024	Tyler Reif	13	Toyota	PHO; 11	KER; 3			IRW; 5	IRW; 3	SHA; 1	TRI; 1	MAD; 14	AAS; 3	KER; 4	PHO; 8			2nd	584
2024	Tyler Reif	13	Ford			PIR; 4	SON; 2											2nd	584
2025	Tanner Reif	13	Toyota	KER; 3	PHO; 13	TUC; 1	CNS; 5	KER; 4		TRI; 6		AAS; 8	MAD; 8					4th	593
2025	Tanner Reif	13	Ford						SON; 9		PIR; 10			LVS; 5				4th	593
2025	Jade Avedisian	13	Toyota												PHO; 19			4th	593
2026	Sean Hingorani	13	Toyota	KER; 5*															
2026	Taylor Reimer	13	Toyota		PHO; 32														
2026	Jade Avedisian	13	Toyota			TUC; 17			TRI; 15										
2026	Kenna Mitchell	13	Toyota				SHA; 8	CNS								KER; 14			
2026	Kenna Mitchell	13	Ford									AAS; 15	MAD; 3	LVS	PHO				
2026	Todd Souza	13	Ford							SON; 6	PIR; 24								
