= Todd Souza =

American racing driver (born 1964)

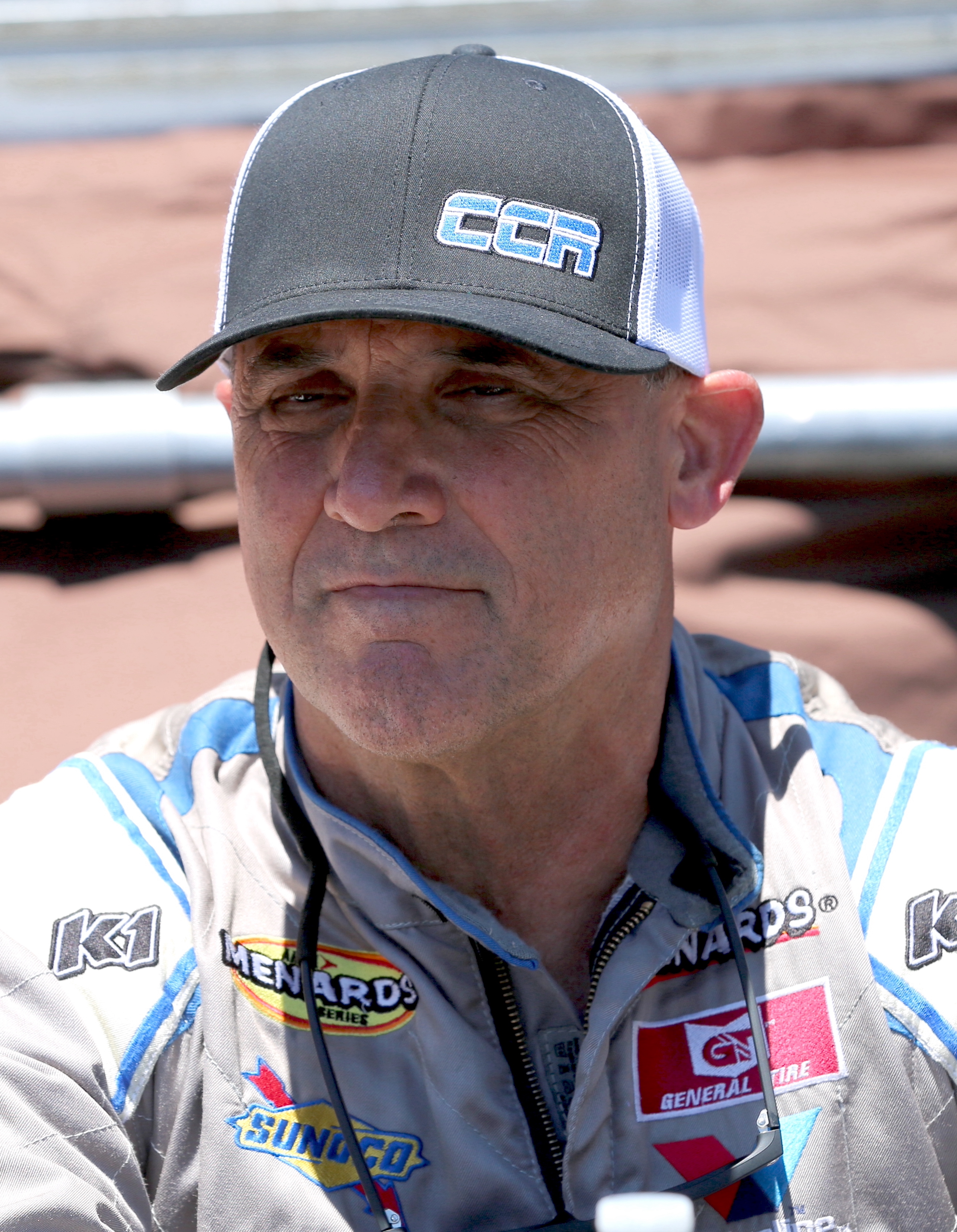
- Souza at Sonoma Raceway in 2026
- Born: December 13, 1964 (age 61); Watsonville, California, U.S.

NASCAR O'Reilly Auto Parts Series career
- 2 races run over 1 year
- 2007 position: 117th
- Best finish: 117th (2007)
- First race: 2007 Telcel-Motorola Mexico 200 (Mexico City)
- Last race: 2007 Arizona Travel 200 (Phoenix)
Wins	Top tens	Poles
0	0	0

ARCA Menards Series career
- 5 races run over 4 years
- Best finish: 57th (2023)
- First race: 2021 General Tire 150 (Phoenix)
- Last race: 2024 General Tire 150 (Phoenix)
Wins	Top tens	Poles
0	2	0

ARCA Menards Series East career
- 3 races run over 3 years
- Best finish: 51st (2006)
- First race: 2005 Burnham Hydronics 200 (Lime Rock)
- Last race: 2015 Bully Hill Vineyards 125 (Watkins Glen)
Wins	Top tens	Poles
0	0	0

ARCA Menards Series West career
- 138 races run over 19 years
- Best finish: 4th (2022)
- First race: 2006 Blue Lizard Australian Suncream 200 (Sonoma)
- Last race: 2026 Portland 112 (Portland)
- First win: 2008 NASCAR Camping World Series 125 (Tooele)
Wins	Top tens	Poles
1	77	0
- Statistics up to date as of August 8, 2026.

Todd Souza (born December 13, 1964) is an American semi-retired professional stock car racing driver. He last competed part-time in the ARCA Menards Series West, driving the No. 13 Ford for his own team, Central Coast Racing. He has also previously driven in what is now the NASCAR O'Reilly Auto Parts Series, making two starts in 2007, and part-time in what is now the ARCA Menards Series East.

== Racing career ==
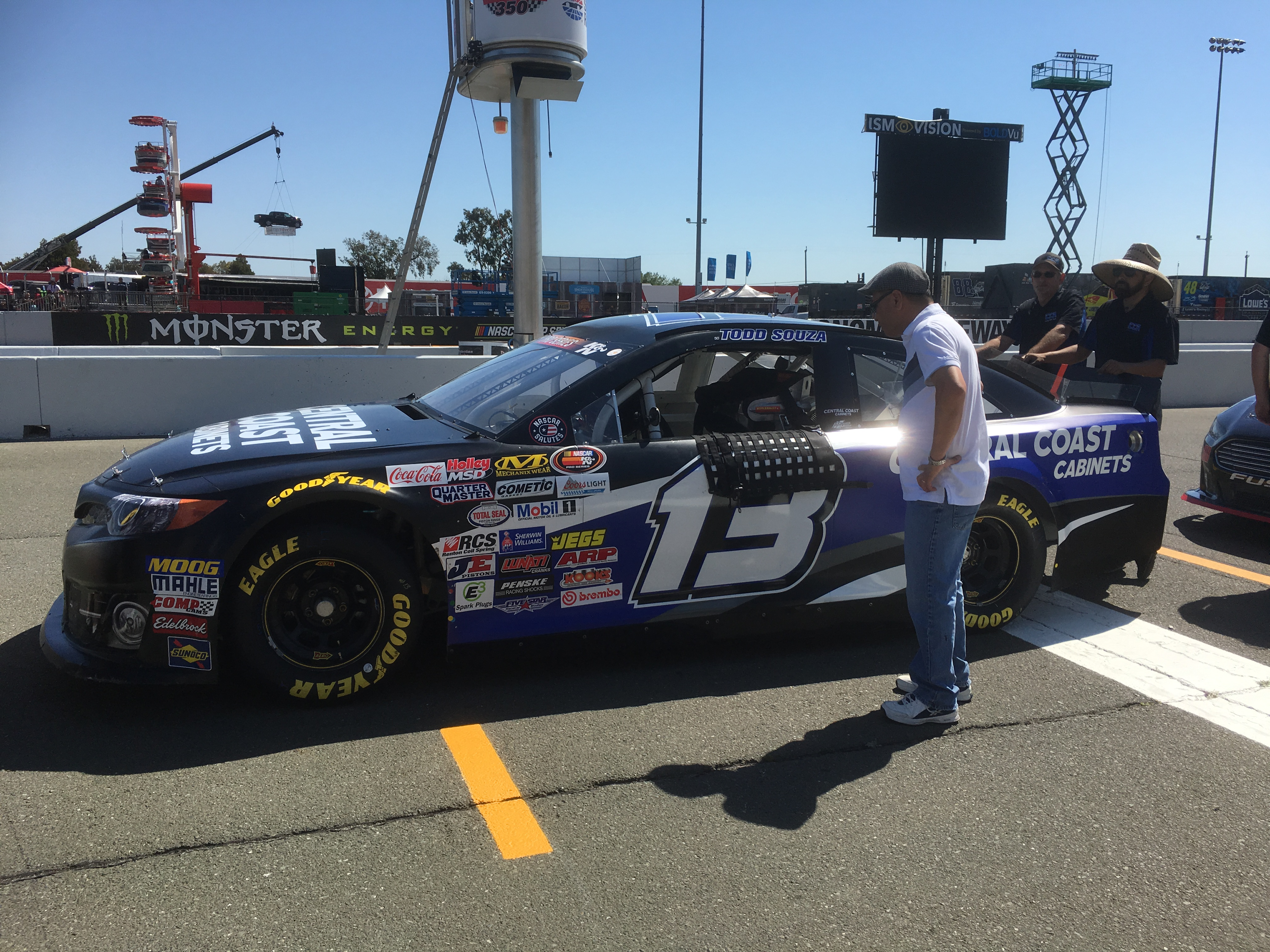
Souza's No. 13 car at Sonoma in 2017

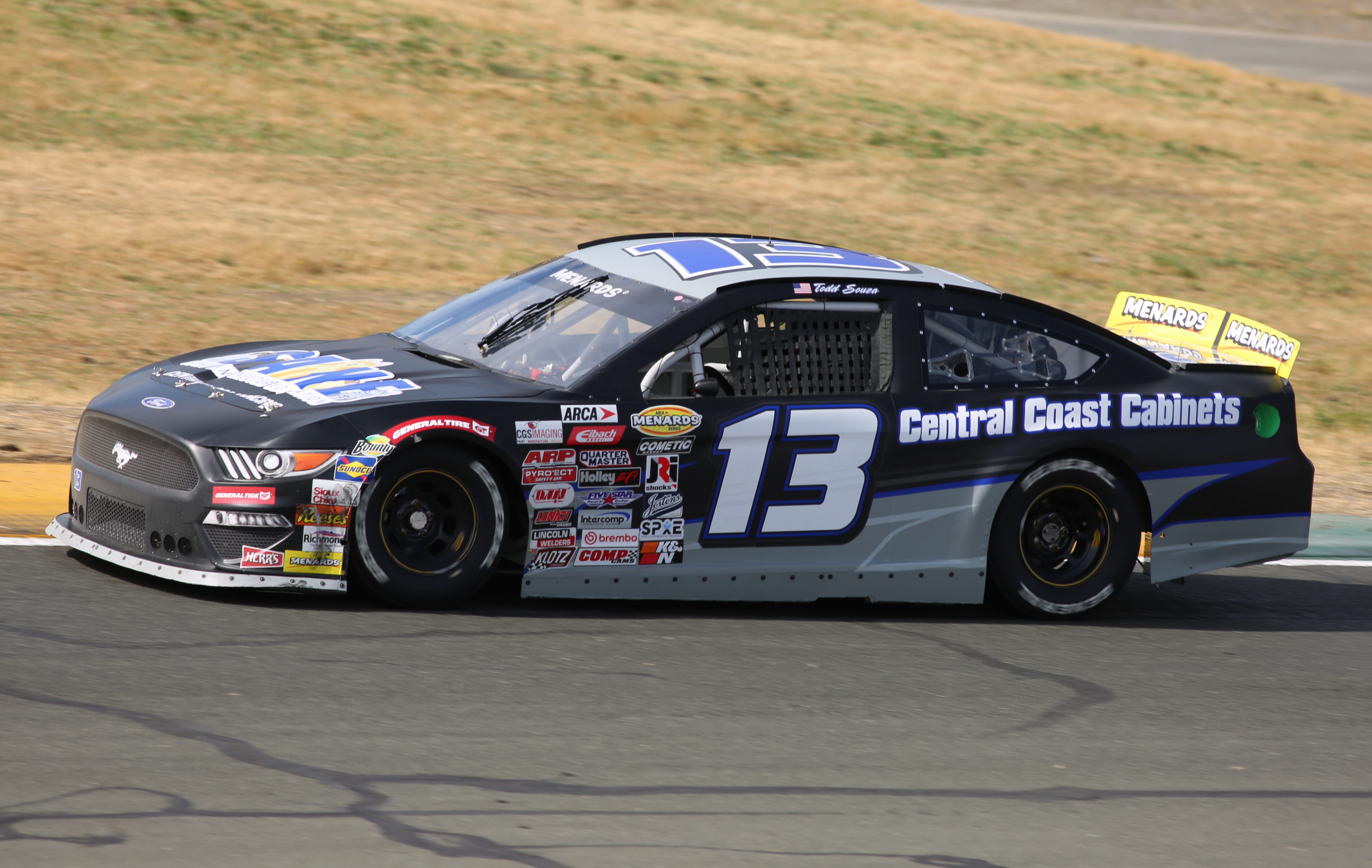
Souza's No. 13 car at Sonoma Raceway in 2023.

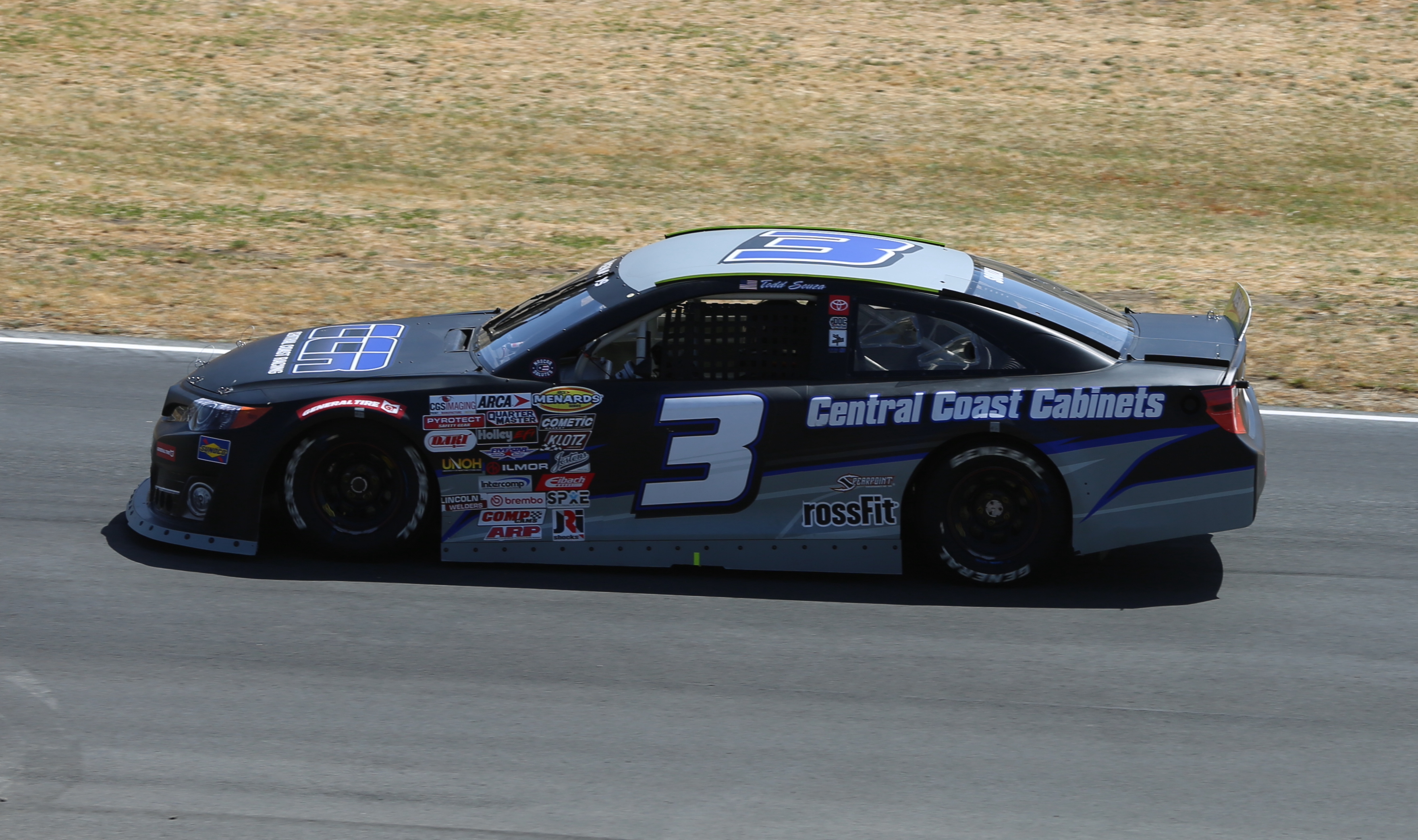
Souza's No. 3 car at Sonoma Raceway in 2024

Souza attempted to make his debut in the NASCAR Busch Series (now the Xfinity Series) in 2005 at the series' inaugural race at the Autódromo Hermanos Rodríguez road course in Mexico City. Fielding his own No. 97 Chevrolet, Souza failed to qualify. He returned later that year at the other road course on the schedule, Watkins Glen, and did not qualify again. After not entering any races in 2006, Souza returned to the Busch Series in 2007, again at Mexico City, but now using the No. 13, his West Series car number. Unlike two years earlier, he made the field this time. After finishing a solid 23rd in his debut, he attempted one other race that year, Phoenix in November, where he successfully qualified for the race but crashed out and finished 40th. That race is his last start in the series to date.

Souza has competed in NASCAR's West Series since 2006. He has one career win in the series, coming at Miller Motorsports Park in Utah in 2008. He completed his first full-time season in 2017 before scaling back to part-time for the 2018 season.

Souza's 2019 season was highlighted by two top-three finishes: a third-place run at Colorado National Speedway (his first podium in two years) and a runner-up finish at Meridian Speedway. He also made headlines at Gateway after on-track contact with Hailie Deegan, calling her "spoiled and rotten" and deeming her move "disrespectful."

Souza's crew chief is Michael Muñoz, who has worked with him since the late 2000s.

On April 14, 2022, Souza stated in an interview for the ARCA website that he might only run part-time in the West Series in 2023 in a new second car for his own team with someone else replacing him in his No. 13 car full-time. Although Souza did return for another full season in 2023, which he confirmed would be his final season as a driver, he and his team did debut a second part-time car, the No. 3, at Shasta with him driving that car and Tyler Reif driving his No. 13 car in that race.

On January 3, 2024, it was announced that Reif will run full-time in the No. 13 car in 2024, with Souza returning to the series part-time in the No. 3 car. He would end up running full-time in the No. 3, with the exception of the race at All American Speedway, where Kyle Keller drove the No. 3 instead.

In 2025, Souza would return to the No. 3 car at Tucson Speedway, where he led the most laps of any driver in the race.

== Motorsports career results ==
=== Racing career summary ===
Season	Series	Team	Races	Wins	Top 5	Top 10	Points	Position
2005	NASCAR Busch North Series	Central Coast Racing	1	0	0	0	115	54th
2006	NASCAR Autozone West Series	Central Coast Racing	3	0	0	1	414	26th
2006	NASCAR Busch East Series	Central Coast Racing	1	0	0	0	115	51st
2007	NASCAR West Series	Central Coast Racing	4	0	0	1	499	25th
2007	NASCAR Busch Series	Central Coast Racing	2	0	0	0	137	117th
2008	NASCAR Camping World West Series	Central Coast Racing	4	1	2	2	491	23rd
2009	NASCAR Camping World West Series	Central Coast Racing	4	0	0	3	570	21st
2010	NASCAR K&N Pro Series West	Central Coast Racing	11	0	0	6	1496	9th
2011	NASCAR K&N Pro Series West	Central Coast Racing	4	0	0	1	472	32nd
2014	NASCAR K&N Pro Series West	Central Coast Racing	2	0	0	0	65	37th
2015	NASCAR K&N Pro Series West	Central Coast Racing	4	0	0	0	84	26th
2015	NASCAR K&N Pro Series East	Central Coast Racing	1	0	0	0	24	56th
2016	NASCAR K&N Pro Series West	Central Coast Racing	4	0	1	1	120	22nd
2017	NASCAR K&N Pro Series West	Central Coast Racing	14	0	2	8	468	6th
2018	NASCAR K&N Pro Series West	Central Coast Racing	9	0	0	3	272	10th
2019	NASCAR K&N Pro Series West	Central Coast Racing	14	0	5	10	486	6th
2020	ARCA Menards Series West	Central Coast Racing	11	0	2	9	550	6th
2021	ARCA Menards Series West	Central Coast Racing	9	0	2	6	410	7th
2021	ARCA Menards Series	Central Coast Racing	1	0	0	1	36	81st
2022	ARCA Menards Series West	Central Coast Racing	11	0	5	10	563	4th
2022	ARCA Menards Series	Central Coast Racing	1	0	0	0	32	88th
2023	ARCA Menards Series West	Central Coast Racing	12	0	3	8	553	6th
2023	ARCA Menards Series	Central Coast Racing	2	0	0	1	70	57th
2024	ARCA Menards Series West	Central Coast Racing	11	0	1	5	440	9th
2024	ARCA Menards Series	Central Coast Racing	1	0	0	0	25	97th
2025	ARCA Menards Series West	Central Coast Racing	7	0	0	3	229	9th
2026	ARCA Menards Series West	Central Coast Racing	2	0	0	1	58*	31st*

=== NASCAR ===
(key) (Bold – Pole position awarded by qualifying time. Italics – Pole position earned by points standings or practice time. * – Most laps led.)

==== Busch Series ====
NASCAR Busch Series results
Year	Team	No.	Make	1	2	3	4	5	6	7	8	9	10	11	12	13	14	15	16	17	18	19	20	21	22	23	24	25	26	27	28	29	30	31	32	33	34	35	NBSC	Pts	Ref
2005	Central Coast Racing	97	Chevy	DAY	CAL	MXC; DNQ	LVS	ATL	NSH	BRI	TEX	PHO	TAL	DAR	RCH	CLT	DOV	NSH	KEN	MLW	DAY	CHI	NHA	PPR	GTY	IRP	GLN; DNQ	MCH	BRI	CAL	RCH	DOV	KAN	CLT	MEM	TEX	PHO	HOM	N/A	0	
2007	Central Coast Racing	13	Chevy	DAY	CAL	MXC; 23	LVS	ATL	BRI	NSH	TEX	PHO	TAL	RCH	DAR	CLT	DOV	NSH	KEN	MLW	NHA	DAY	CHI	GTY	IRP	CGV	GLN	MCH	BRI	CAL	RCH	DOV	KAN	CLT	MEM	TEX	PHO; 40	HOM	117th	137	

==== K&N Pro Series East ====
NASCAR K&N Pro Series East results
Year	Team	No.	Make	1	2	3	4	5	6	7	8	9	10	11	12	13	14	NKNPSEC	Pts	Ref
2005	Central Coast Racing	13	Chevy	STA	HOL	ERI	NHA	WFD	ADI	STA	DUB	OXF	NHA	DOV	LRP; 16	TMP		54th	115	
2006	Central Coast Racing	13	Chevy	GRE	STA	HOL	TMP	ERI	NHA	ADI	WFD	NHA	DOV	LRP; 16				51st	115	
2010	Central Coast Racing	13	Chevy	GRE	SBO	IOW; DNQ	MAR	NHA	LRP	LEE	GRE	NHA	DOV					N/A	0	
2015	Central Coast Racing	13	Toyota	NSM	GRE	BRI	IOW	BGS	LGY	COL	NHA	IOW	GLN; 20	MOT	VIR	RCH	DOV	56th	24	

=== ARCA Menards Series ===
(key) (Bold – Pole position awarded by qualifying time. Italics – Pole position earned by points standings or practice time. * – Most laps led. ** – All laps led.)

ARCA Menards Series results
Year	Team	No.	Make	1	2	3	4	5	6	7	8	9	10	11	12	13	14	15	16	17	18	19	20	AMSC	Pts	Ref
2021	Central Coast Racing	13	Ford	DAY	PHO; 8	TAL	KAN	TOL	CLT	MOH	POC	ELK	BLN	IOW	WIN	GLN	MCH	ISF	MLW	DSF	BRI	SLM	KAN	81st	36	
2022	Central Coast Racing	13	Ford	DAY	PHO; 12	TAL	KAN	CLT	IOW	BLN	ELK	MOH	POC	IRP	MCH	GLN	ISF	MLW	DSF	KAN	BRI	SLM	TOL	88th	32	
2023	Central Coast Racing	13	Ford	DAY	PHO; 11	TAL	KAN	CLT	BLN	ELK	MOH; 7	IOW	POC	MCH	IRP	GLN	ISF	MLW	DSF	KAN	BRI	SLM	TOL	57th	70	
2024	Central Coast Racing	3	Toyota	DAY	PHO; 19	TAL	DOV	KAN	CLT	IOW	MOH; Wth	BLN	IRP	SLM	ELK	MCH	ISF	MLW	DSF	GLN	BRI	KAN	TOL	97th	25	

==== ARCA Menards Series West ====
ARCA Menards Series West results
Year	Team	No.	Make	1	2	3	4	5	6	7	8	9	10	11	12	13	14	AMSW	Pts	Ref
2006	Central Coast Racing	13	Chevy	PHO	PHO; DNQ	S99	IRW	SON; 6	DCS	IRW; 12	EVG	S99	CAL; 17	CTS	AMP			26th	414	
2007	Central Coast Racing	13	Chevy	CTS	PHO; 7	AMP	ELK	IOW	CNS	SON; 14	DCS	IRW	MMP; 15	EVG	CSR; 18	AMP		25th	499	
2008	Central Coast Racing	13	Chevy	AAS	PHO	CTS	IOW	CNS	SON; 35	IRW	DCS	EVG	MMP; 1	IRW	AMP; 25	AAS; 4		23rd	491	
2009	Central Coast Racing	13	Chevy	CTS	AAS	PHO; 12	MAD	IOW	DCS	SON; 6	IRW	PIR; 8	MMP; 7	CNS	IOW	AAS		21st	570	
2010	Central Coast Racing	13	Chevy	AAS; 10		IOW; DNQ	DCS; 7	SON; 6	IRW; 28	PIR; 13	MRP; 10	CNS; 8	MMP; 12	AAS; 21				9th	1496	
2010	Central Coast Racing	13	Toyota		PHO; 8										PHO; 14			9th	1496	
2011	Central Coast Racing	13	Toyota	PHO; 16	AAS	MMP	IOW	LVS										32nd	472	
2011	Central Coast Racing	13	Chevy						SON; 10	IRW	EVG	PIR; 23	CNS	MRP	SPO	AAS	PHO; 13	32nd	472	
2014	Central Coast Racing	13	Chevy	PHO	IRW	S99	IOW	KCR	SON; 11	SLS	CNS	IOW	EVG	KCR	MMP; 12	AAS	PHO	37th	65	
2015	Central Coast Racing	13	Toyota	KCR	IRW; 25	TUS; 16	IOW	SHA								PHO; 17		26th	84	
2015	Central Coast Racing	13	Ford						SON; 34	SLS	IOW	EVG	CNS	MER	AAS			26th	84	
2016	Central Coast Racing	13	Toyota	IRW; 24	KCR	TUS	OSS	CNS	SON; 16	SLS	IOW	EVG	DCS	MMP; 11	MMP; 5	MER	AAS	22nd	120	
2017	Central Coast Racing	13	Toyota	TUS; 22	KCR; 10	IRW; 11	IRW; 10	SPO; 12	OSS; 3	CNS; 10	SON; 8		EVG; 8	DCS; 8	MER; 4	AAS; 11	KCR; 13	6th	468	
2017	Central Coast Racing	3	Toyota									IOW; 18						6th	468	
2018	Central Coast Racing	13	Toyota	KCR; 22	TUS; 10	TUS; 14	OSS; 8	CNS; 12	SON; 19	DCS; Wth	IOW	EVG; 12	GTW	LVS; 18	MER	AAS	KCR; 9	10th	272	
2019	Central Coast Racing	13	Toyota	LVS; 5	IRW; 11	TUS; 8	TUS; 16	CNS; 3	SON; 27	DCS; 7	IOW; 16	EVG; 6	GTW; 10	MER; 2	AAS; 5	KCR; 5	PHO; 9	6th	486	
2020	Central Coast Racing	13	Toyota	LVS; 8	MMP; 6	MMP; 6	IRW; 7	EVG; 7	DCS; 11	CNS; 8	LVS; 5	AAS; 2	KCR; 7	PHO; 17				6th	550	
2021	Central Coast Racing	13	Ford	PHO; 8	SON; 5							PHO; 16						7th	410	
2021	Central Coast Racing	13	Toyota			IRW; 7	CNS; 7	IRW; 7	PIR; 17	LVS; 16	AAS; 4							7th	410	
2022	Central Coast Racing	13	Ford	PHO; 12	IRW; 9	KCR; 6			IRW; 10	EVG; 5		AAS; 4	LVS; 10	PHO; 5				4th	563	
2022	Central Coast Racing	13	Toyota				PIR; 3	SON; 8			PIR; 2							4th	563	
2023	Central Coast Racing	13	Ford	PHO; 11	IRW; 11	KCR; 9	PIR; 22	SON; 8	IRW; 4									6th	553	
2023	Central Coast Racing	3	Ford							SHA; 10	EVG; 10	AAS; 5	LVS; 7	MAD; 2	PHO; 26			6th	553	
2024	Central Coast Racing	3	Toyota	PHO; 19	KER; 9	PIR; 22	SON; 29	IRW; 10	IRW; 7	SHA; 7	TRI; 4	MAD; 11	AAS; Wth	KER; 12	PHO; 14			9th	440	
2025	Central Coast Racing	3	Toyota	KER	PHO	TUC; 8*	CNS; 7	KER; 13	SON; 23	TRI; 8	PIR	AAS; 11	MAD; 11	LVS	PHO			9th	229	
2026	Central Coast Racing	13	Ford	KER	PHO	TUC	SHA	CNS	TRI	SON; 6	PIR; 24	AAS	MAD	LVS	PHO	KER		35th	58	

^{*} Season still in progress
