= Jim Warn =

American racing driver (born 1983)

- Born: October 21, 1983 (age 43); Aurora, Oregon, U.S.

ARCA Menards Series West career
- 25 races run over 2 years
- Best finish: 9th (2009)
- First race: 2008 Toyota/NAPA Auto Care 150 (Roseville)
- Last race: 2009 Toyota/Copart 150 (Roseville)
Wins	Top tens	Poles
0	9	0
- Statistics up to date as of April 17, 2026.

Jim Warn (born October 21, 1983) is an American former professional stock car racing and sports car racing driver.

== Racing career ==
Warn began his racing career at the age of 15. He competed in the Sports Car Club of America at Portland International Raceway. In 2004, he tried racing sprint cars. Warn transitioned to stock cars in 2005, racing at South Sound Speedway in the super stock class and winning rookie of the year. He continued to race late models in 2006. In 2007, Warn competed in the Montana 200 as well as full-time in the ARCA West Late Model Challenge Series, where he finished in the top-ten in seven of ten races. Warn moved to the NASCAR Camping World West Series in 2008, competing for rookie of the year for his father's team, MJ2 Racing. He competed in the first twelve races, only not competing in the season finale at All American Speedway. He scored four top-tens during the season, including in his debut at All American and a stretch of three in a row late in the season, with a best finish of seventh at Miller Motorsports Park. Warn ended the season 14th in points. He returned to the series full-time again in 2009, scoring five top-ten finishes. This included a career-best second, where he was runner-up to Paulie Harraka at Colorado National Speedway. Warn improved to ninth in points, however would not compete in the series again.

== Personal life ==
Warn graduated from the Washington State University in 2006 with a degree in business management. His father Jim owned MJ2 Racing, the team he competed for in ARCA and NASCAR.

== Motorsports career results ==
=== NASCAR ===
(key) (Bold - Pole position awarded by qualifying time. Italics - Pole position earned by points standings or practice time. * – Most laps led.)

==== Camping World West Series ====
NASCAR Camping World West Series results
Year	Team	No.	Make	1	2	3	4	5	6	7	8	9	10	11	12	13	NCWWSC	Pts	Ref
2008	MJ2 Racing	10	Chevy	AAS; 8	PHO; 25	CTS; 12	IOW; 15	CNS; 13	SON; 12	IRW; 15	DCS; 8	EVG; 9	MMP; 7	IRW; 17	AMP; 12	AAS	14th	1509	
2009	MJ2 Racing	10	Chevy	CTS; 10	AAS; 17	PHO; 11	MAD; 17	IOW; 7	DCS; 9	SON; 38	IRW; 19	PIR; 9	MMP; 22	CNS; 2	IOW; 17	AAS; 7	9th	1590	
