= West Coast Stock Car Motorsports Hall of Fame 150 =

West Coast Stock Car Motorsports Hall of Fame 150 may refer to:

- West Series races at Kern, the title sponsor of the race from 2025.
- West Series races at Irwindale, the title sponsor of the race from 2023–2024.
