= 2009 NASCAR Camping World West Series =

56th season of NASCAR's Camping World West Series

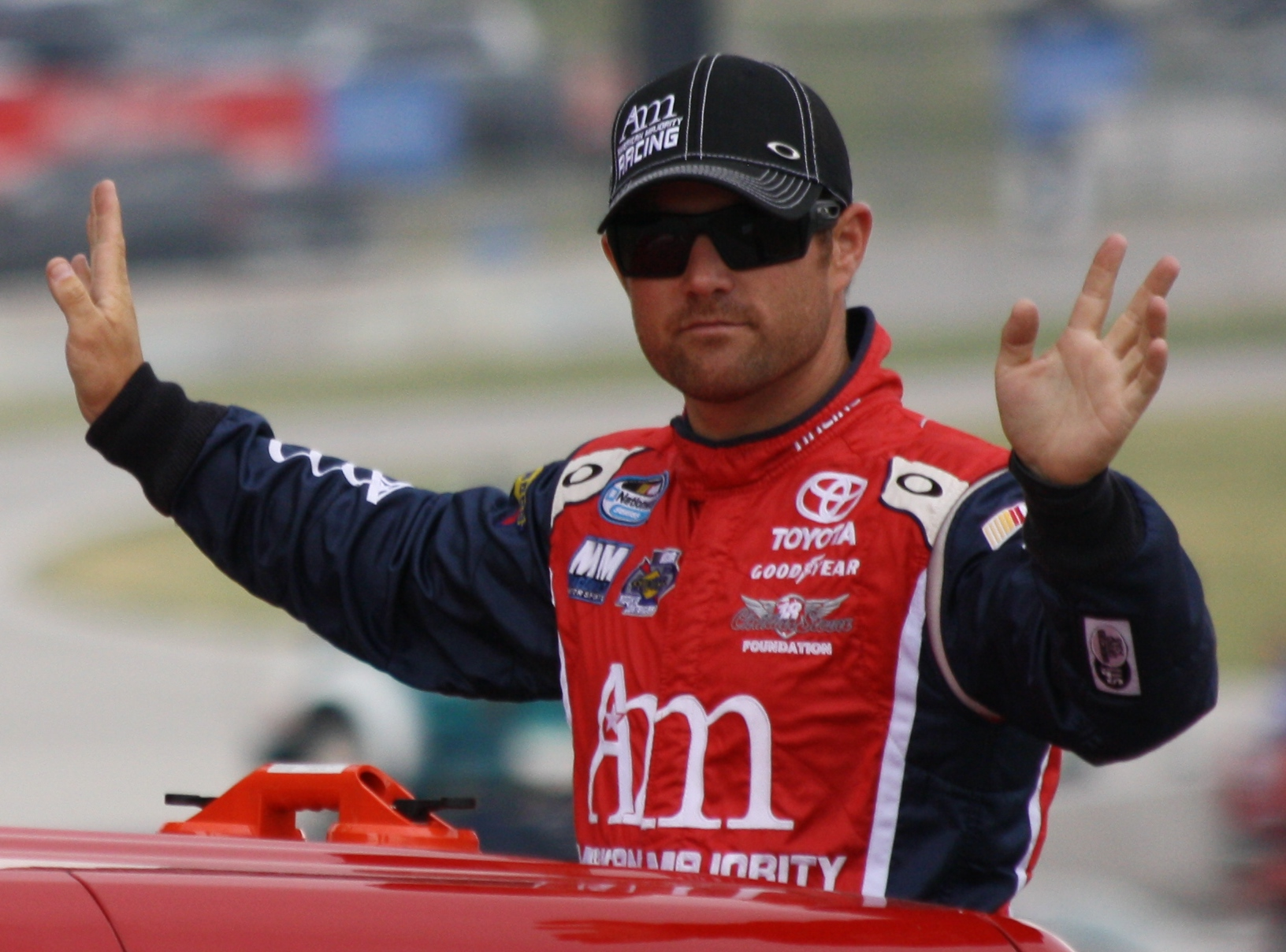
Jason Bowles, the 2009 Camping World West Series champion.

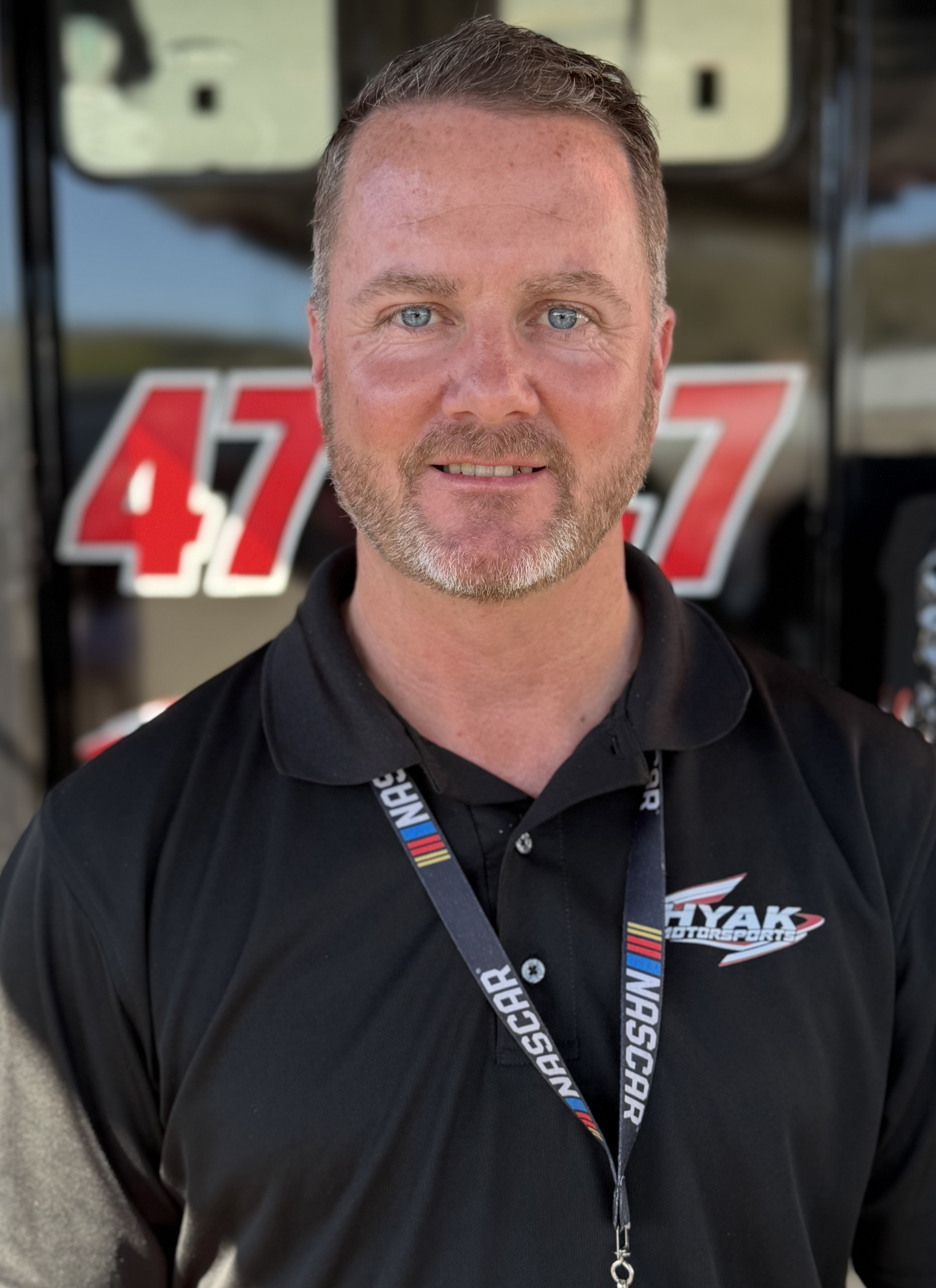
Eric Holmes, the defending West Series champion, finished second behind Bowles in the championship by 123 points.

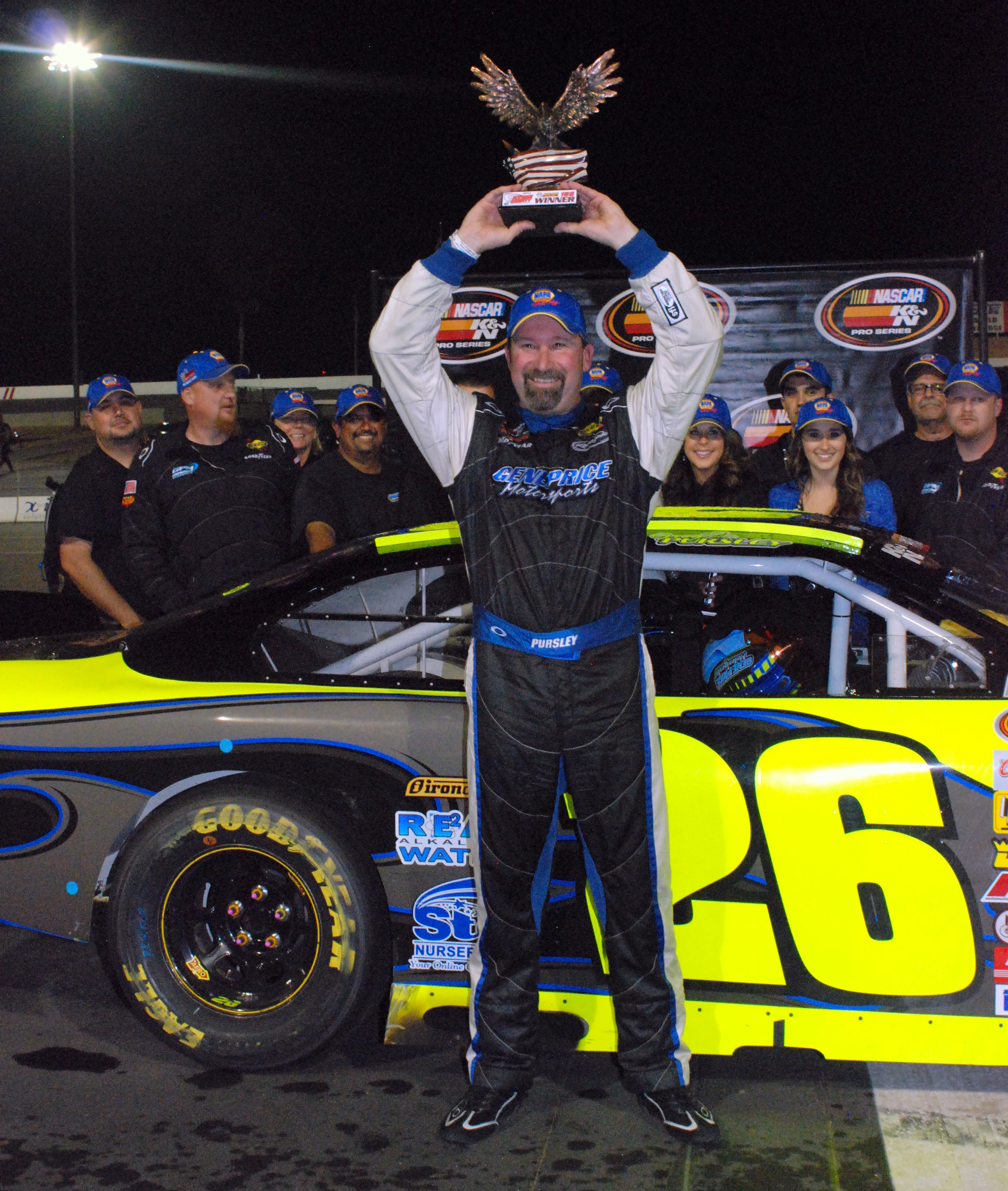
Greg Pursley finished third in the championship.

The 2009 NASCAR Camping World West Series was the 56th season of the NASCAR Camping World West Series, a regional stock car racing series sanctioned by NASCAR. It began with the Allstate Texas Thunder 150 at Thunderhill Raceway on March 14, 2009, and concluded with the Toyota/Copart 150 at All-American Speedway on September 26, 2009. Jason Bowles won the championship, 123 points in front of Eric Holmes.

This was the last season for the West Series with the Camping World title sponsorship, as Camping World decided to be the title sponsor for the NASCAR Truck Series starting in 2009, they did not renew their title sponsorship of NASCAR's East and West Series after their contract for ended at the end of the 2009 season, with them sponsoring all three series for that year only. K&N Filters became the new title sponsor for the East and West Series starting in 2010.

== Schedule and results ==
The 2009 season included 13 individual races, although All American Speedway and Iowa Speedway hosted two races each. The first race at Iowa was in combination with the NASCAR Camping World East Series.

Date	Name	Racetrack	Location	Winner
March 14	Allstate Texas Thunder 150	Thunder Hill Raceway	Kyle, Texas	Greg Pursley
April 4	Toyota/NAPA Auto Parts 150	All American Speedway	Roseville, California	Eric Holmes
April 16	Jimmie Johnson Foundation 150	Phoenix International Raceway	Avondale, Arizona	Jason Bowles
April 25	NAPA Auto Parts/Toyota 150	Madera Speedway	Madera, California	Eric Holmes
May 17	Long John Silver's 200	Iowa Speedway	Newton, Iowa	Kyle Busch
June 6	Bi-Mart Firecracker 150	Douglas County Speedway	Roseburg, Oregon	Eric Holmes
June 20	Bennett Lane Winery 200 presented by Supercuts	Infineon Raceway	Sonoma, California	Jason Bowles
July 4	King Taco 200	Toyota Speedway at Irwindale	Irwindale, California	Jason Bowles
July 19	Bi-Mart Salute to the Troops 125	Portland International Raceway	Portland, Oregon	Jim Inglebright
August 1	Miller Motorsports Park 125	Miller Motorsports Park	Tooele, Utah	Patrick Long
August 15	Toyota/NAPA 150	Colorado National Speedway	Erie, Colorado	Paulie Harraka
September 4	Central IA Building & Construction Trades 125	Iowa Speedway	Newton, Iowa	David Mayhew
September 26	Toyota/Copart 150	All American Speedway	Roseville, California	Paulie Harraka

== Full Drivers' Championship ==
(key) Bold – Pole position awarded by time. Italics – Pole position set by owner's points. * – Most laps led.

Pos	Driver	CTS	AAS	PHO	MAD	IOW	DCS	SON	IRW	PIR	MMP	CNS	IOW	AAS	Pts
1	Jason Bowles	9	**2**	1*	**7**	4 (Note: Finished 9th overall)	2	1	**1***	5	3	13	2	4	2158
2	Eric Holmes	3	1*	2	1	16 (Note: Finished 36th overall)	**1***	3	6	7	8	**9***	10	16	2035
3	Greg Pursley	1	6	**5**	5	12 (Note: Finished 25th overall)	8	20	5	2	4	4	**7**	3	1978
4	Paulie Harraka	17	3	8	4	2 (Note: Finished 5th overall)	13	14	3	16	2	1	12	**1***	1951
5	Brett Thompson	5	15	9	6	3 (Note: Finished 7th overall)	6	13	17	4	12	15	9	6	1805
6	David Mayhew	**6***	4	14	2	1 (Note: Finished 3rd overall)	3	2	7	**15**	23	16	1*		1799
7	Moses Smith	2	8	16	8	8 (Note: Finished 14th overall)	5	29	9	14	5	3	26	5	1766
8	Blake Koch	11	5	7	13	9 (Note: Finished 16th overall)	7	11	8	12	9	14	20	14	1726
9	Jim Warn	10	17	11	17	7 (Note: Finished 12th overall)	9	38	19	9	22	2	17	7	1590
10	Jamie Dick	4	16	29	15		10	28	15	6	20	7	21	13	1423
11	Wes Banks	12	9	18	10	14 (Note: Finished 29th overall)		26	14	22	16	11		15	1295
12	Jack Sellers	13	13	24	12		16	22			18	12	24	18	1114
13	Phil Dugan		14	33	19		11	21	16	17	17	10	27		1081
14	Mike David	7	7	4	3*	6 (Note: Finished 11th overall)	4	15							1060
15	Jim Inglebright	15	11	30	16			39		1	14			9	926
16	Jonathan Hale	14	10	31	9		14	37			13	8			902
17	Jonathon Gomez	8	12	19	11	11 (Note: Finished 23rd overall)							11		765
18	Jim Marchino	19	18							24	24	17		12	636
19	Chris Johnson			28		10 (Note: Finished 17th overall)			10				13	8	623
20	Brian Wong							33	18	3*	6		14		619
21	Todd Souza			12				6		8	7				570
22	Patrick Long							**23** (Note: Long originally crossed the line first, but was penalized to last on the lead lap)	4		**1***		15		567
23	Daryl Harr			13		13 (Note: Finished 27th overall)		25			15		23		553
24	Johnny Borneman III			27		5 (Note: Finished 10th overall)		5	13						521
25	Kyle Kelley			21				10		11	10				498
26	Travis Bennett			20			15	40	11				22		491
27	Travis Milburn								20	19	26	6			449
28	Paul Pedroncelli Jr.				18		12	27						21	418
29	Jeff Barkshire			DNQ					2				5		388
30	Greg Rayl						17			20				17	327
31	Brian Jackson			25				DNQ		25	21				310
32	Billy Kann			23		15 (Note: Finished 34th overall)							25		300
33	Andrew Myers			6					12						277
34	Stan Silva Jr.							9		10					272
35	Hershel McGriff							DNQ		13	19				267
36	Scott Ivie							DNQ		26	11				255
37	Rodd Kneeland				14									11	251
38	Ross Strmiska				20			12							230
39	Ryan Foster			26				8							227
40	Garland Self							16		18					224
41	Kristin Bumbera			22									16		212
42	Keith Spangler			17					21						212
43	Michael Self									23	25				182
44	Eric Schmidt													2	175
45	Steve Park			3											170
46	Troy Ermish							34						19	167
47	Max Gresham												3		165
48	Boris Said							4							160
49	Brett Moffitt												4		160
50	Jeff Jefferson											5			155
51	Ryan Gifford												6		150
52	Tom Hubert							7							146
53	Brian Ickler												8		142
54	David Gilliland			32				32							139
55	Terry Henry			10											134
56	Martin McKeefery													10	134
57	Joey Logano							17*							122
58	Austin Dillon			15											118
59	Bow Carpenter	16													115
60	Phillip Hollis	18													109
61	Pat O'Keefe							18							109
62	Jarit Johnson												18		109
63	Rick Boysal							19							106
64	Jeff Anton												19		106
65	Chris Scribner													20	103
66	Terry Fisher									21					100
67	Eric Curran							24							91
68	Alex Kennedy							30							73
69	Brad Lloyd							31							70
70	Matt Crafton			DNQ											61
71	Brandon Davis							35							58
72	Tony Toste							36							55
73	Brady Flaherty							DNQ							31

== See also ==
- 2009 NASCAR Sprint Cup Series
- 2009 NASCAR Nationwide Series
- 2009 NASCAR Camping World Truck Series
- 2009 ARCA Re/Max Series
- 2009 NASCAR Camping World East Series
- 2009 NASCAR Whelen Modified Tour
- 2009 NASCAR Whelen Southern Modified Tour
- 2009 NASCAR Canadian Tire Series
- 2009 NASCAR Corona Series
- 2009 NASCAR Mini Stock Series
