= 2008 NASCAR Camping World West Series =

55th season of the NASCAR Camping World West Series

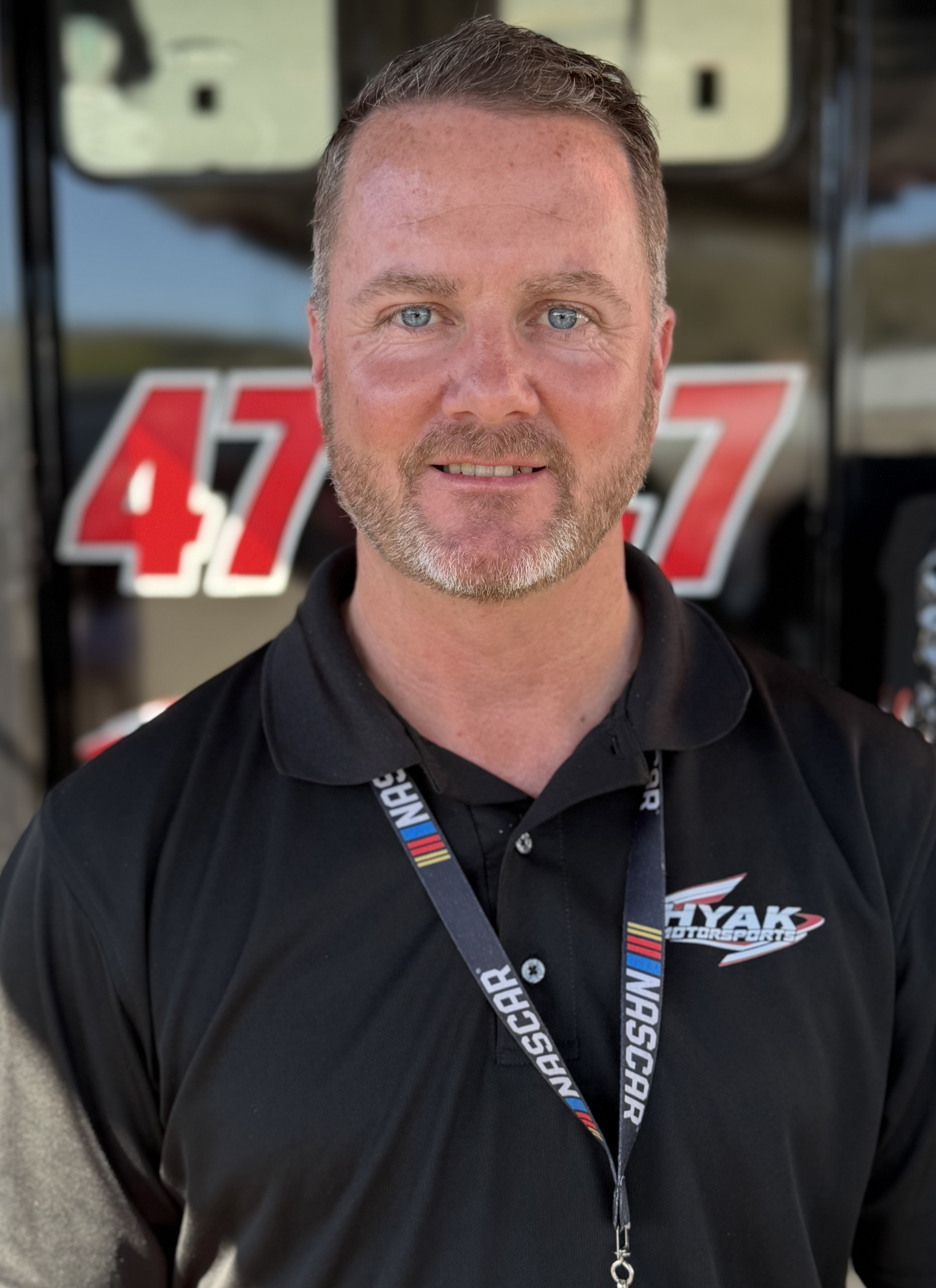
Eric Holmes, the 2008 West Series champion.

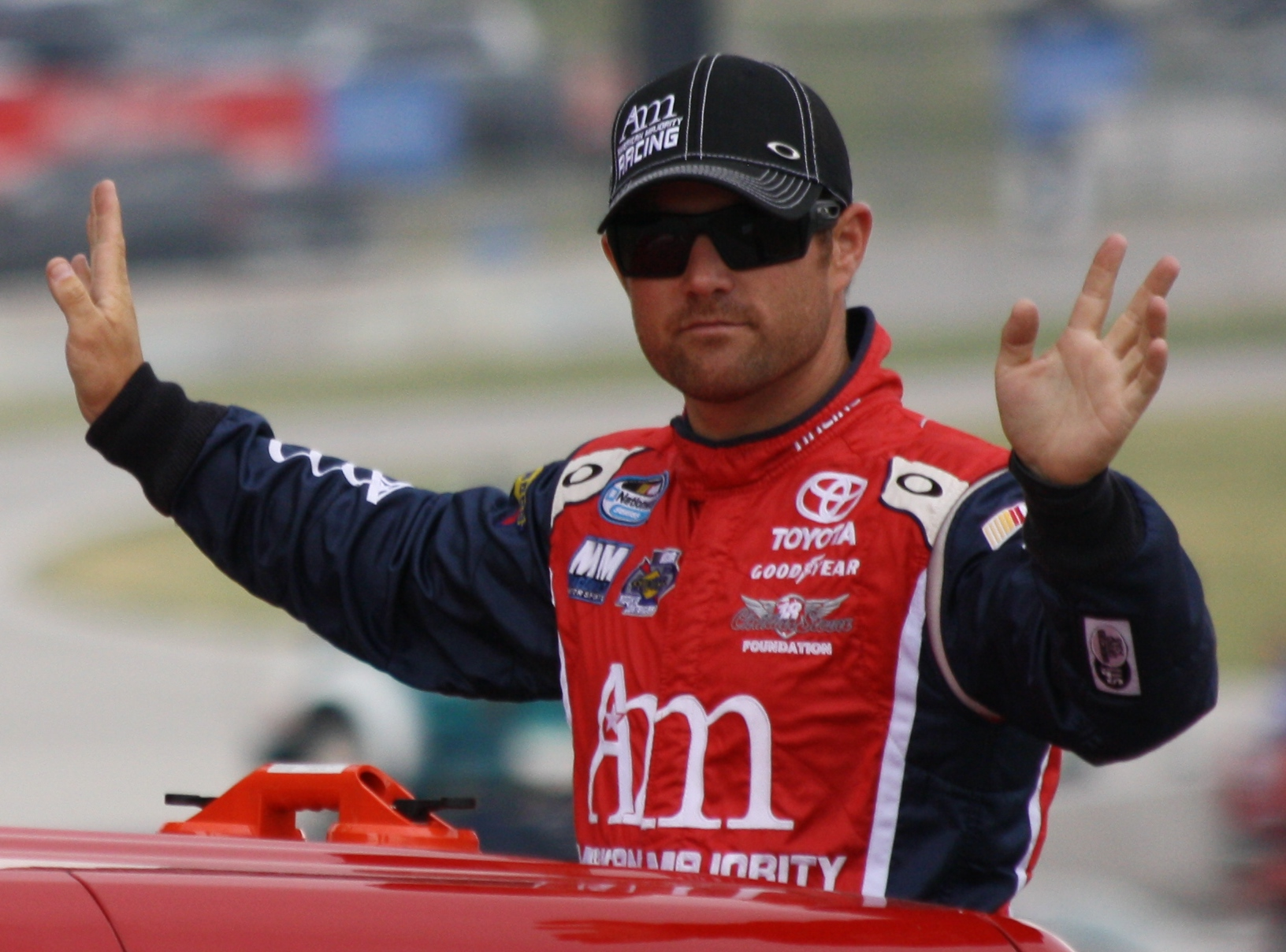
Jason Bowles finished second behind Holmes in the championship by 48 points.

The 2008 NASCAR Camping World West Series was the 55th season of the Camping World West Series, a regional stock car racing series sanctioned by NASCAR. It began with the Toyota/NAPA Auto Care 150 at All-American Speedway on March 29, 2008, and concluded with the Toyota/NAPA Auto Parts 150 by Thunder Valley, again at All-American Speedway, on October 25, 2008. Eric Holmes won the championship, 48 points in front of Jason Bowles. This was Holmes' second championship after his first came in 2006. He would go on to win a third championship in 2010, ironically meaning that he won a title every other year in this span of five years.

The 2008 season also was the first with Camping World as the title sponsor of the series, the first for the series since AutoZone sponsored the tour in 2006.

== Schedule and results ==
The 2008 season included 13 individual races, although All American Speedway and Toyota Speedway at Irwindale hosted two races each. The race at Iowa Speedway was in combination with the NASCAR Camping World East Series.

Date	Name	Racetrack	Location	Winner
March 29	Toyota/NAPA Auto Care 150	All American Speedway	Roseville, California	Eric Holmes
April 10	Jimmie Johnson Foundation 150	Phoenix International Raceway	Avondale, Arizona	Mike David
April 19	Allstate Texas Thunder 150	Thunder Hill Raceway	Kyle, Texas	Eric Holmes
May 18	U.S. Cellular 200 presented by Wellmark	Iowa Speedway	Newton, Iowa	Brian Ickler
June 7	Toyota/NAPA 150	Colorado National Speedway	Erie, Colorado	Eric Holmes
June 21	Bennett Lane Winery 200 by Supercut	Infineon Raceway	Sonoma, California	Jason Bowles
July 4	California Highway Patrol 200	Toyota Speedway at Irwindale	Irwindale, California	Jason Bowles
July 11	Toyota/Bi-Mart 150 by NAPA	Douglas County Speedway	Roseburg, Oregon	Eric Holmes
July 26	Toyota/Concept Race Cars & Parts 150	Evergreen Speedway	Monroe, Washington	Jeff Barkshire
August 2	NASCAR Camping World Series 125	Miller Motorsports Park	Tooele, Utah	Todd Souza
August 16	Pipe Careers 200 presented by Pipe Trades	Toyota Speedway at Irwindale	Irwindale, California	Jason Bowles
September 13	Golden State Steel & Stair 200	Altamont Motorsports Park	Tracy, California	Jason Fensler
October 25	Toyota/NAPA Auto Parts 150 by Thunder Valley	All American Speedway	Roseville, California	Jason Bowles

== Full Drivers' Championship ==
(key) Bold – Pole position awarded by time. Italics – Pole position set by owner's points. * – Most laps led.

Pos	Driver	AAS	PHO	CTS	IOW	CNS	SON	IRW	DCS	EVG	MMP	IRW	AMP	AAS	Pts
1	Eric Holmes	1*	23*	**1**	12 (Note: Finished 27th overall)	**1***	**2**	2	**1***	**2**	16	8	4*	5*	2098
2	Jason Bowles	**13**	11	6	7 (Note: Finished 18th overall)	3	1*	**1**	3	3	**10**	**1***	**19**	1	2050
3	Jeff Barkshire	15	5	8	2 (Note: Finished 12th overall)	9	10	4	5	1*	11	2	3	15	1955
4	Mike David	3	1	7	4 (Note: Finished 15th overall)	2	9	11	17	11	2	14	17	2	1919
5	Jim Inglebright	14	22	5	1 (Note: Finished 9th overall)	7	3	5	6	5	13*	11	15	10	1840
6	Moses Smith	5	7	16	6 (Note: Finished 17th overall)	6	28	9	7	7	4	9	11	3	1823
7	Austin Cameron	17	13	2*	3 (Note: Finished 14th overall)	8	7	6	18	14	3	24	5	21	1770
8	David Mayhew	2	30	3	22 (Note: Finished 42nd overall)	16	32	8*	4	16	8	5	2	9	1724
9	Johnny Borneman III	4	15	20	13 (Note: Finished 28th overall)	20	26	3	2	6	17	6	6	18	1699
10	Jason Patison	10	12	10	5 (Note: Finished 16th overall)	11	39	24	13	12	12	3	7	13	1630
11	Mike Gallegos	22	8	9	9 (Note: Finished 23rd overall)	4	22	7	11	13	27	23	10	19	1593
12	Jamie Dick	9	18	18	17 (Note: Finished 35th overall)	15	6	18	15	17	18	15	26	7	1533
13	Daryl Harr	20	20	22	16 (Note: Finished 34th overall)	5	34	26	12	10	5	19	9	12	1511
14	Jim Warn	8	25	12	15 (Note: Finished 31st overall)	13	12	15	8	9	7	17	12		1509
15	Jeff Jefferson	11	3	14	10 (Note: Finished 24th overall)	17	29	25	16	4	6	16	18		1475
16	Jack Sellers	25	21	19		18	24	22	10		19	22	27	20	1113
17	Jonathan Hale	18	35			19	40	16	19		23	21	28	24	901
18	Brett Thompson	19	4	13	20 (Note: Finished 40th overall)	10		23				4			886
19	Wes Banks	12	36	15			21	19			15		16	8	881
20	Eric Hardin	7	26	4	18 (Note: Finished 38th overall)	12	25	13							839
21	Tony Toste		9				38			15	9	28	DNQ	16	701
22	Andrew Myers		31		8 (Note: Finished 22nd overall)		17	12				10			585
23	Todd Souza						35				1		25	4	491
24	Terry Henry				19 (Note: Finished 39th overall)			10				13	14		485
25	Lloyd Mack	21	28	21	DNQ	21									470
26	Paul Pedroncelli Jr.							21	14			27	22		400
27	Brian Wong						16	30			14	26			394
28	Ryan Philpott	23	29				23						13		388
29	Paulie Harraka										26		8	**6**	382
30	Billy Kann		DNQ			14		20				20			376
31	Eric Richardson	6	37				41					12			369
32	Greg Pursley		24		11 (Note: Finished 26th overall)		37					29			349
33	Stan Silva Jr.		33		14 (Note: Finished 29th overall)		15								303
34	Jonathon Gomez								9	8					280
35	Ryan Foster		**32**		23 (Note: Finished 43rd overall)		19								272
36	Chris Johnson							17				7			258
37	Kristin Bumbera			11				14							251
38	Kyle Kelley						8				24				238
39	Pat O'Keefe			17									20		215
40	Martin McKeefery												DNQ	11	206
41	Luis Martinez Jr.										22	18			206
42	Travis Milburn										28			14	200
43	Josh Bews												21	23	194
44	Eric Schmidt	16						29							191
45	Jason Fensler												1		185
46	Greg Rayl												DNQ	17	182
47	Nick Lynch		2												170
48	Tom Hubert						4								165
49	Tim Woods	24						31							161
50	Garland Self						30				25				161
51	Dan Holcomb											25	DNQ		161
52	Ken Schrader						5								155
53	James Buescher		6												150
54	Max Dumarey		27		DNQ		36								137
55	Matt Kobyluck		10												134
56	Alex Kennedy						11								130
57	Scott Ivie						13								124
58	Jarit Johnson		14												121
59	Troy Ermish						14								121
60	Marc Davis		17												117
61	Brian Pannone		16												115
62	Travis McCullough						18								109
63	Bobby Hillis Jr.		19												106
64	Kevin O'Connell						20								103
65	Shane Hubbard										20				103
66	Alex Haase				21 (Note: Finished 41st overall)										100
67	Brian Jackson										21				100
68	Blake Koch													22	97
69	Auggie Vidovich												23		94
70	Ross Strmiska												24		91
71	Paul Morris						27								82
72	Jameel Saied							27							82
73	David Ross							28							79
74	Robert Davis						31								70
75	P. J. Jones						33								69
76	Rodd Kneeland												DNQ		67
77	Jason Noll		34												61

== See also ==
- 2008 NASCAR Sprint Cup Series
- 2008 NASCAR Nationwide Series
- 2008 NASCAR Craftsman Truck Series
- 2008 ARCA Re/Max Series
- 2008 NASCAR Camping World East Series
- 2008 NASCAR Whelen Modified Tour
- 2008 NASCAR Whelen Southern Modified Tour
- 2008 NASCAR Canadian Tire Series
- 2008 NASCAR Corona Series
