= Dan Holcomb =

Biographical details
- Born: June 25, 1934; Columbia, Missouri, U.S.
- Died: August 25, 2024 (aged 90); Tampa, Florida, U.S.
- Education: Washburn (BS); FSU (MS)

Coaching career (HC unless noted)
- 1965–1986: South Florida (soccer)
- 1978: South Florida (tennis)

Head coaching record
- Overall: 216–86–22 (soccer)
- Tournaments: 24–7–4 (postseason)

Accomplishments and honors

Championships
- 8× Sun Belt Conference Tournament (1976, 1977, 1979–1982, 1985, 1986); 6× NCAA Tournament appearances (1969–1973, 1975, 1982)

Awards
- 2× Sun Belt Coach of the Year (1976, 1980); USF Athletic Hall of Fame (2010); Tampa Bay Soccer Hall of Fame Pioneer Award (2026)

Danny Lee Holcomb (June 25, 1934 – August 25, 2024) was an American soccer coach, tennis coach, and university professor. He was the inaugural head coach of the South Florida Bulls men's soccer program, serving from 1965 to 1986. During his 22-year tenure, he compiled an overall record of 216–86–22, secured 22 consecutive winning seasons, won eight Sun Belt Conference tournament championships, and made six NCAA Tournament appearances.

Holcomb coached the first intercollegiate varsity athletic event in the history of the University of South Florida (USF) in October 1965 and was named Sun Belt Coach of the Year twice (1976, 1980). He also served as USF's head men's tennis coach in 1978 and worked as an assistant professor of physical education until his retirement in 2003. He was inducted into the USF Athletic Hall of Fame in 2010.

== Playing career ==
Holcomb played collegiate football for the Washburn Ichabods while attending Washburn University in Topeka, Kansas.

== Coaching career ==
=== Soccer ===
Holcomb founded the men's soccer program at the University of South Florida (USF) in 1965 and led it for its first 22 seasons. The Bulls achieved 22 consecutive winning seasons and compiled an overall record of 216–86–22 (.701 winning percentage).

The team captured eight Sun Belt Conference championships (including four consecutive titles from 1979 to 1982) and made six NCAA Tournament appearances, advancing to the second round twice. Holcomb was named Sun Belt Conference Coach of the Year in 1976 and 1980.

His teams posted strong postseason results, with a 24–7–4 record in postseason play and a 22–2–3 mark in Sun Belt Conference tournament games. Holcomb also briefly coached the USF tennis team in addition to soccer.

=== Tennis ===
While completing his graduate studies at Florida State University in the early 1960s, Holcomb assisted with the university's tennis program. This background in tennis later led to him being named the head men's tennis coach at USF for the 1978 season when the program faced a sudden coaching vacancy.

== Legacy ==
Holcomb was inducted into the USF Athletic Hall of Fame in 2010 as part of its second class. He is recognized for establishing the foundation of one of USF's most successful athletic programs, which has since produced numerous professional players and further NCAA success.

== Personal life ==
Following his graduate studies, Holcomb relocated to Tampa, Florida, to join the physical education faculty at the newly established University of South Florida. Beyond his 22-year tenure coaching the men's soccer program, he also served as an assistant professor in USF's College of Education, teaching courses in kinesiology and sports science until his retirement.

Holcomb was married to his wife, Joanne, for over 50 years, and the couple had three children. Following his coaching career, he remained in the Tampa Bay sports community until his death on August 25, 2024, at the age of 90.

== Head coaching record ==
=== Soccer ===
Year	Team	Overall	Conference	Standing	Postseason
South Florida Bulls (Independent) (1965–1975)
1965	South Florida	6–4–0	—		
1966	South Florida	10–0–1	—		
1967	South Florida	10–2–0	—		
1968	South Florida	6–2–1	—		
1969	South Florida	8–2–0	—		NCAA Round of 16
1970	South Florida	7–3–1	—		NCAA First Round
1971	South Florida	7–3–0	—		NCAA First Round
1972	South Florida	9–4–2	—		NCAA Division II Round of 16
1973	South Florida	10–3–0	—		NCAA Division I Round of 16
1974	South Florida	6–6–2	—		
1975	South Florida	9–3–1	—		NCAA First Round
South Florida Bulls (Sun Belt Conference) (1976–1986)
1976	South Florida	11–6–1	4–0–0	1st	Sun Belt Tournament Champions
1977	South Florida	10–5–0	2–1–0	1st	Sun Belt Tournament Champions
1978	South Florida	7–7–1	1–2–0	3rd	
1979	South Florida	12–6–0	3–1–0	1st	Sun Belt Tournament Champions
1980	South Florida	14–1–1	3–0–0	1st	Sun Belt Tournament Champions
1981	South Florida	12–2–1	3–0–0	1st	Sun Belt Tournament Champions
1982	South Florida	13–3–3	4–0–0	1st	NCAA First Round; Sun Belt Tournament Champions
1983	South Florida	15–4–1	3–0–1	1st (East)	
1984	South Florida	13–6–2	3–1–0	1st (East)	
1985	South Florida	12–6–2	3–0–1	1st (East)	Sun Belt Tournament Champions
1986	South Florida	9–8–2	2–0–1	1st (East)	Sun Belt Tournament Champions
South Florida:		216–86–22	28–5–3		
Total:		216–86–22			

== Honors ==
=== Coaching awards ===
- Sun Belt Conference Coach of the Year (2): 1976, 1980

=== Championships ===
- Sun Belt Conference Tournament Champions (8): 1976, 1977, 1979, 1980, 1981, 1982, 1985, 1986
- Sun Belt Conference Regular Season Champions (7): 1979, 1980, 1981, 1982, 1983 (East), 1984 (East), 1985 (East)

=== Hall of Fame inductions ===
- USF Athletic Hall of Fame: Class of 2010
- Tampa Bay Soccer Hall of Fame Pioneer Award: Awarded posthumously in 2026
