= Jason Bowles =

American racing driver (born 1982)

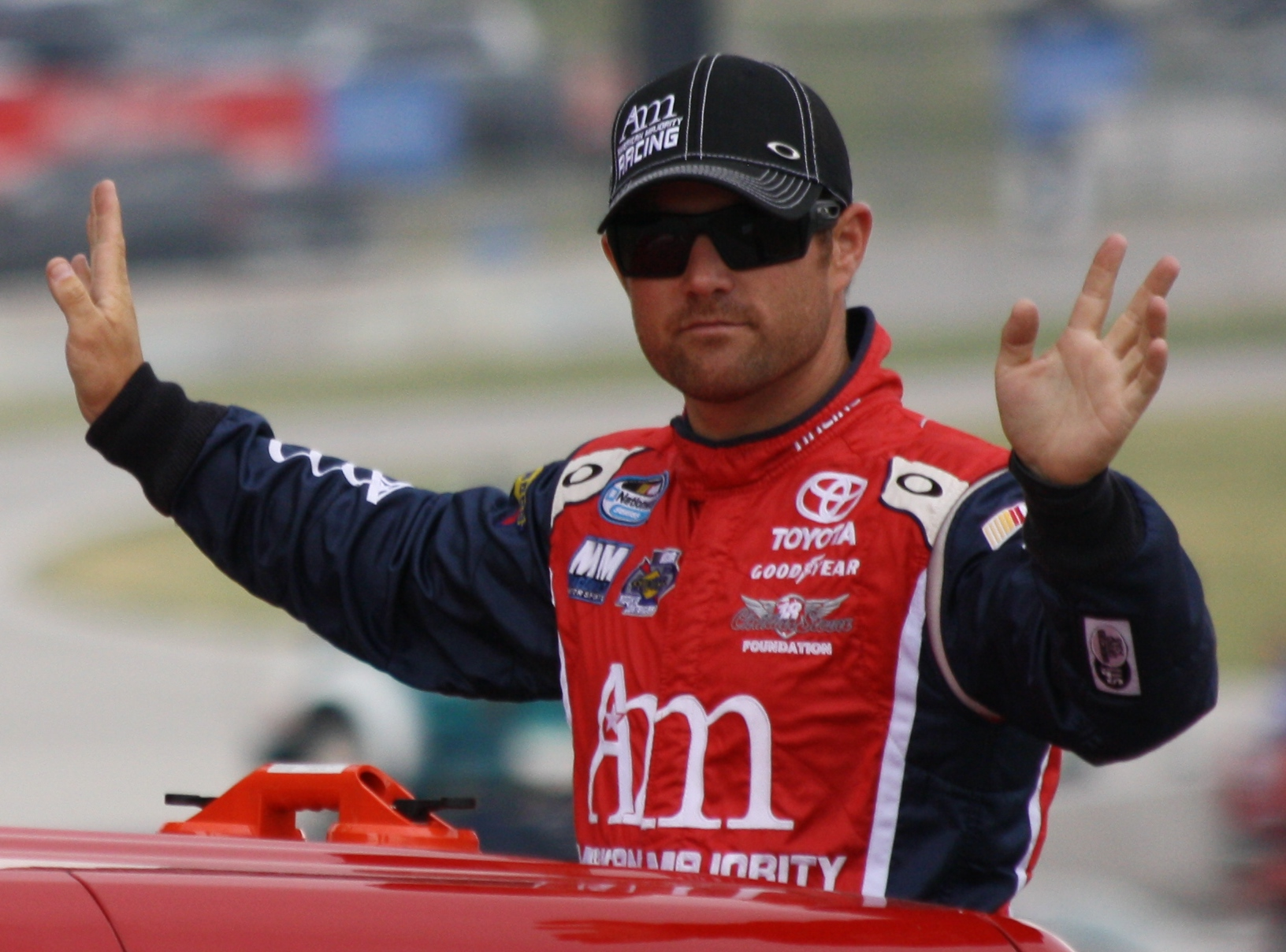
- Bowles at Road America in 2012
- Born: November 24, 1982 (age 43); Ontario, California, U.S.
- Achievements: 2009 Camping World West Series Champion; 2010 Toyota All-Star Showdown Winner
- Awards: 2007 NASCAR West Series Rookie of the Year

NASCAR O'Reilly Auto Parts Series career
- 40 races run over 5 years
- 2013 position: 88th
- Best finish: 13th (2012)
- First race: 2009 Able Body Labor 200 (Phoenix)
- Last race: 2013 U.S. Cellular 250 (Iowa)
Wins	Top tens	Poles
0	0	0

NASCAR FedEx Freight Truck Series career
- 4 races run over 2 years
- 2013 position: 106th
- Best finish: 65th (2010)
- First race: 2010 Smith's 350 (Las Vegas)
- Last race: 2013 Mudsummer Classic (Eldora)
Wins	Top tens	Poles
0	0	0

NASCAR Canada Series career
- 5 races run over 2 years
- Best finish: 26th (2010)
- First race: 2010 Vortex Brake Pads 200 (Mosport)
- Last race: 2011 NAPA Autopro 100 (Montreal)
Wins	Top tens	Poles
0	3	1
- Statistics up to date as of November 16, 2013.

Jason Bowles (born November 24, 1982) is an American former professional stock car racing driver. He won the NASCAR K&N Pro Series West championship in 2009.

== Racing career ==
=== Early career ===
Bowles made his NASCAR West Series debut in the No. 22 Sunrise Ford/Turbo Torq Ford in 2007, posting two wins – one at California Speedway and the other at Miller Motorsports Park – on his way to becoming Rookie of the Year. For 2008 he recorded four wins and five poles, finishing second in the points. In 2009, Bowles won at Phoenix International Raceway, Toyota Speedway at Irwindale and Infineon Raceway, recorded three poles, and won the Camping World West Series championship.

=== NASCAR ===
For 2010, Bowles no longer had a full-time ride, instead running partial schedules in the K&N Pro Series West and NASCAR Canadian Tire Series. He entered the Toyota All-Star Showdown at Irwindale winning on a late-race pass, the biggest win of his career.

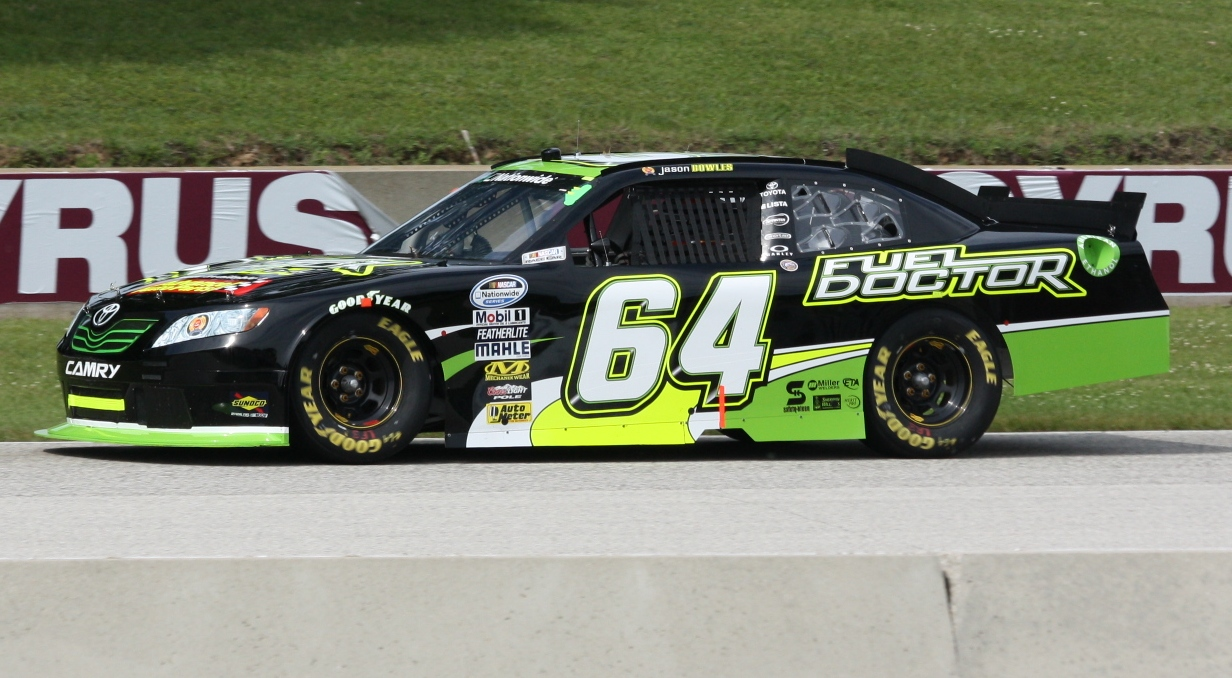
2011 Nationwide car

Bowles made his NASCAR Nationwide Series debut at Phoenix International Raceway in 2009 for Specialty Racing, crashing out and finishing 31st. In 2010, he finished 25th in the spring Phoenix race for RAB Racing. Bowles also ran in three NASCAR Craftsman Truck Series races in 2010 with a best finish of sixteenth. He ran three Nationwide Series races with Rusty Wallace Racing in 2011 in the No. 64 Toyota. For 2012, he moved up to the Nationwide Series full-time with MacDonald Motorsports, competing for Rookie of the Year in the No. 81; he finished thirteenth in season points.

In practice and qualifying for the 2013 Toyota/Save Mart 350 at Sonoma Raceway, Bowles substituted for Brian Vickers in the No. 55 Michael Waltrip Racing Toyota, as Vickers was running both the Sonoma race and the Johnsonville Sausage 200 at Road America that weekend.

== Motorsports career results ==
=== NASCAR ===
(key) (Bold – Pole position awarded by qualifying time. Italics – Pole position earned by points standings or practice time. * – Most laps led. ** – All laps led.)

==== Sprint Cup Series ====
NASCAR Sprint Cup Series results
Year	Team	No.	Make	1	2	3	4	5	6	7	8	9	10	11	12	13	14	15	16	17	18	19	20	21	22	23	24	25	26	27	28	29	30	31	32	33	34	35	36	NSCC	Pts	Ref
2013	Michael Waltrip Racing	55	Toyota	DAY	PHO	LVS	BRI	CAL	MAR	TEX	KAN	RCH	TAL	DAR	CLT	DOV	POC	MCH	SON; QL^{†}	KEN	DAY	NHA	IND	POC	GLN	MCH	BRI	ATL	RCH	CHI	NHA	DOV	KAN	CLT	TAL	MAR	TEX	PHO	HOM	NA	-	
^{†} - Qualified for Brian Vickers

==== Nationwide Series ====
NASCAR Nationwide Series results
Year	Team	No.	Make	1	2	3	4	5	6	7	8	9	10	11	12	13	14	15	16	17	18	19	20	21	22	23	24	25	26	27	28	29	30	31	32	33	34	35	NNSC	Pts	Ref
2009	Specialty Racing	61	Chevy	DAY	CAL	LVS	BRI	TEX	NSH	PHO	TAL	RCH	DAR	CLT	DOV	NSH	KEN	MLW	NHA	DAY	CHI	GTY	IRP	IOW	GLN	MCH	BRI	CGV	ATL	RCH	DOV	KAN	CAL	CLT	MEM	TEX	PHO; 31	HOM	139th	70	
2010	Go Green Racing	39	Ford	DAY	CAL	LVS	BRI; DNQ	NSH																															118th	88	
2010	RAB Racing	09	Ford						PHO; 25	TEX	TAL	RCH	DAR	DOV	CLT	NSH	KEN	ROA	NHA	DAY	CHI	GTY	IRP	IOW	GLN	MCH	BRI	CGV	ATL	RCH	DOV	KAN	CAL	CLT	GTY	TEX	PHO	HOM	118th	88	
2011	Rusty Wallace Racing	64	Toyota	DAY	PHO	LVS	BRI	CAL	TEX	TAL	NSH	RCH	DAR	DOV	IOW	CLT	CHI	MCH	ROA; 34	DAY	KEN	NHA	NSH	IRP	IOW	GLN; 36	CGV; 13	BRI	ATL	RCH	CHI	DOV	KAN	CLT	TEX	PHO	HOM		61st	49	
2012	MacDonald Motorsports	81	Dodge	DAY; 41	PHO; 19		BRI; 25																			BRI; 18		RCH; 23			DOV; 20		KAN; 20						13th	715	
2012	MacDonald Motorsports	81	Toyota			LVS; 27		CAL; 15	TEX; 18	RCH; 30	TAL; 34	DAR; 21	IOW; 17	CLT; 33	DOV; 15	MCH; 19	ROA; 14	KEN; 22	DAY; 14	NHA; 16	CHI; 23	IND; 16	IOW; 29	GLN; 17	CGV; 26		ATL; 16		CHI; 28	KEN; 16		CLT; 28		TEX; 33	PHO; 17	HOM; 29			13th	715	
2013	The Motorsports Group	47	Chevy	DAY	PHO	LVS	BRI	CAL	TEX	RCH; DNQ	TAL	DAR; DNQ	CLT	DOV																									88th	5	
2013	The Motorsports Group	46	Chevy												IOW; 39	MCH	ROA	KEN	DAY	NHA	CHI	IND	IOW; 39	GLN															88th	5	
2013	Richard Childress Racing	3	Chevy																						MOH; QL^{†}	BRI	ATL	RCH	CHI	KEN	DOV	KAN	CLT	TEX	PHO	HOM			88th	5	
^{†} - Qualified for Austin Dillon

^{*} Season still in progress
^{1} Ineligible for series points

==== Camping World Truck Series ====
NASCAR Camping World Truck Series results
Year	Team	No.	Make	1	2	3	4	5	6	7	8	9	10	11	12	13	14	15	16	17	18	19	20	21	22	23	24	25	NCWTC	Pts	Ref
2010	Germain Racing	77	Toyota	DAY	ATL	MAR	NSH	KAN	DOV	CLT	TEX	MCH	IOW	GTY	IRP	POC	NSH	DAR	BRI	CHI	KEN	NHA	LVS; 16						65th	303	
2010	Billy Ballew Motorsports	15	Toyota																					MAR; 18	TAL				65th	303	
2010	Eddie Sharp Racing	46	Toyota																							TEX; 28	PHO	HOM	65th	303	
2013	Wauters Motorsports	5	Chevy	DAY	MAR	CAR	KAN	CLT	DOV	TEX	KEN	IOW	ELD; 24	POC	MCH	BRI	MSP	IOW	CHI	LVS	TAL	MAR	TEX	PHO	HOM				106th	0^{1}	

==== K&N Pro Series East ====
NASCAR K&N Pro Series East results
Year	Team	No.	Make	1	2	3	4	5	6	7	8	9	10	11	12	13	14	NKNPSEC	Pts	Ref
2010	Go Green Racing	38	Ford	GRE; 25	SBO	IOW	MAR	NHA	LRP	LEE	JFC	NHA	DOV					61st	88	
2011	Gaunt Brothers Racing	75	Toyota	GRE	SBO	RCH; 6	IOW	BGS	JFC	LGY	NHA	COL	GRE	NHA	DOV			53rd	150	
2012	MacDonald Motorsports	49	Dodge	BRI	GRE	RCH	IOW; 12	BGS	JFC	LGY	CNB	COL	IOW	NHA	DOV	GRE	CAR	58th	32	

==== K&N Pro Series West ====
NASCAR K&N Pro Series West results
Year	Team	No.	Make	1	2	3	4	5	6	7	8	9	10	11	12	13	14	NKNPSWC	Pts	Ref
2001	Triton Realty Motorsports	42	Ford	PHO	LVS; DNQ	TUS	MMR	CAL	IRW	LAG	KAN	EVG	CNS	IRW	RMR	LVS	IRW	75th	73	
2007	Sunrise Ford Racing	22	Ford	CTS; 5	PHO; 18	AMP; 5	ELK; 5	IOW; 14	CNS; 5	SON; 29	DCS; 3	IRW; 11	MMP; 1	EVG; 16	**CSR**; 1*	AMP; 5		3rd	1871	
2008	Sunrise Ford Racing	22	Ford	AAS; 13	PHO; 11	CTS; 6	IOW; 7	CNS; 3	SON; 1*	**IRW**; 1	DCS; 3	EVG; 3	**MMP**; 10	**IRW**; 1**	**AMP**; 19	AAS; 1		2nd	2050	
2009	Sunrise Ford Racing	6	Ford	CTS; 9	AAS; 2	**PHO**; 1*	MAD; 7	IOW; 4	DCS; 2	**SON**; 1	**IRW**; 1*	PIR; 5	MMP; 3	CNS; 13	IOW; 2	AAS; 4		1st	2158	
2010	Richard Childress Racing with Jim Offenbach	31	Chevy	AAS	PHO; 2	IOW	DCS	**SON**; 22	IRW	PIR	MRP	CNS	MMP					31st	410	
2010	Sunrise Ford Racing	6	Ford											AAS; 9	PHO			31st	410	
2011	Gaunt Brothers Racing	75	Toyota	PHO	AAS	MMP	IOW; 5	LVS	SON	IRW	EVG	PIR	CNS	MRP	SPO	AAS		52nd	228	
2011	Richard Childress Racing with Jim Offenbach	31	Chevy														PHO; 30	52nd	228	

==== Canadian Tire Series ====
NASCAR Canadian Tire Series results
Year	Team	No.	Make	1	2	3	4	5	6	7	8	9	10	11	12	13	Rank	Points	Ref
2010	Gaunt Brothers Racing	11	Dodge	DEL	MSP; 3	ASE	TOR; 2	EDM	MPS	SAS	CTR	MSP	CGV; 20	BAR	RIS	KWA	26th	443	
2011	Gaunt Brothers Racing	11	Dodge	MSP	ICAR	DEL	MSP	**TOR**; 21	MPS	SAS	CTR	CGV; 3	BAR	RIS	KWA		46th	170	

=== ARCA Racing Series ===
(key) (Bold – Pole position awarded by qualifying time. Italics – Pole position earned by points standings or practice time. * – Most laps led.)

ARCA Racing Series results
Year	Team	No.	Make	1	2	3	4	5	6	7	8	9	10	11	12	13	14	15	16	17	18	19	ARSC	Pts	Ref
2011	Eddie Sharp Racing	6	Toyota	DAY; 5	TAL	SLM	TOL	NJE	CHI	POC	MCH	WIN	BLN	IOW	IRP	POC	ISF	MAD	DSF	SLM	KAN	TOL	91st	205	

Sporting positions
Preceded by Eric Holmes	NASCAR Camping World West Series Champion; 2009	Succeeded by Eric Holmes
Achievements
Preceded by Joey Logano	Toyota All-Star Showdown Winner; 2010	Succeeded by Final event
