= ARCA races at Sonoma =

ARCA Menards Series West race at Sonoma Raceway

General Tire 150

ARCA Menards Series West
- Venue: Sonoma Raceway
- Location: Sonoma, California, United States
- Corporate sponsor: General Tire
- First race: 1969
- Distance: 93 miles (150 km)
- Laps: 47
- Previous names: Weibel 150 (1969); Sta-Power 150 (1969); Winston Sears Point 100 (1978–1979); Golden State Winston 100 (1980); Sears Point Winston 200 (1981-1983); Winston / Sonoma 200 (1984); AC-Delco 200 (1985, 1987); AC-Delco 300 (1986); 7-Up 200 (1988); Winston 200 (1989); Sonoma 100 (1995-1996); Fry's Electronics / Iomega Zip 100 (1997); Iomega / Fry's 100 (1998); Blue Lizard Australian Suncream 200 (2006); Blue Lizard Suncream 200 (2007); Bennett Lane Winery 200 by Supercuts (2008–2009); Thunder Valley Casino Resort 200 (2010–2011); Pick-N-Pull Racing To Stop Hunger 200 (2012); Carneros 200 (2013–2015, 2017–2018); Chevy's Fresh Mex 200 (2016); Procore 200 (2019) General Tire 200 (2021-2025)
- Most wins (driver): Jimmy Insolo; Hershel McGriff; Bill Schmitt (3)
- Most wins (team): Sunrise Ford Racing (5)
- Most wins (manufacturer): Ford (12)

Circuit information
- Surface: Asphalt
- Length: 1.99 mi (3.20 km)
- Turns: 12

The General Tire 150 is a 93-mile (150 km) ARCA Menards Series West race held annually at Sonoma Raceway.

== History ==
Only a year after the track first opened, the ARCA Menards Series West (then known as NASCAR Pacific Coast Late Model Division) held their first races at the track in 1969, which were a pair of 60-lap races won by Ray Elder and Jack McCoy. The series did not return until 1978, and from there, the track became a mainstay on the West Series schedule (excluding a brief hiatus from the track from 1999 to 2005).

From 1989 to 1997, the NASCAR Cup Series' annual race at Sonoma was also held as a combination event with the West Series. The highest-finishing West Series regular in the race would earn 1st-place points that counted towards the West Series, no matter how low they finished. After 1997, the race was solely held as a Cup Series event because West Series teams felt they were at a disadvantage against the more financed Cup teams. After the 1998 event, the race took a seven-year hiatus before returning in 2006.

In 2021, General Tire, the official tire of the ARCA Menards Series, became the title sponsor for the race. In 2026, the race was shortened to 150 miles.

== Past winners ==
Year	Date	Driver	Team	Manufacturer	Race distance		Race time	Average speed (mph)
Year	Date	Driver	Team	Manufacturer	Laps	Miles	Race time	Average speed (mph)
1969	June 8	Ray Elder	Elder Racing	Dodge	60	150 (240)	2:15:00	66.667
1969	August 10	Jack McCoy	Ernie Conn	Dodge (2)	60	151.4 (242.24)	2:10:00	68.701
1970 – 1977	Not held							
1978	August 13	Jimmy Insolo	Gerald Cracker	Pontiac	59	100.3 (160.48)	1:15:58	79.21
1979	August 12	Jimmy Insolo (2)	Gerald Cracker (2)	Pontiac (2)	59	100.3 (160.48)	1:16:23	78.785
1980	August 24	Jimmy Insolo (3)	Charles Williamson	Oldsmobile	59	100.3 (160.48)	1:12:09	83.41
1981	September 27	Bill Schmitt	Schmitt Racing Enterprises	Buick	70	126 (201.6)	1:30:07	79.231
1982	August 8	Roy Smith	John Edgett	Buick (2)	70	126 (201.6)	1:31:54	77.693
1983	May 22	Hershel McGriff	Gary Smith	Buick (3)	70	126 (201.6)	1:30:01	83.984
1984	October 14	Jim Bown	Kieper Racing	Buick (4)	70	126 (201.6)	1:26:33	87.348
1985	April 28	Hershel McGriff (2)	Gary Smith (2)	Pontiac (3)	74	125.8 (201.26)	1:41:30	74.365
1986	April 27	Jim Robinson	Lois Williams	Oldsmobile (2)	75	189 (302.4)	2:29:26	75.887
1987	April 26	Hershel McGriff (3)	Gary Smith (3)	Pontiac (4)	75	127.5 (204)	1:35:33	80.062
1988	April 24	Bill Schmitt (2)	Schmitt Racing Enterprises (2)	Chevrolet	50	126 (201.6)	1:46:15	71.153
1989	October 1	Bill Schmitt (3)	Schmitt Racing Enterprises (3)	Chevrolet (2)	50	126 (201.6)	1:44:57	72.034
1990 – 1994	Not held							
1995	October 7	Doug George	Olson Technology Racing	Ford	40	100.8 (161.28)	1:24:04	71.942
1996	October 5	Butch Gilliland	Bill Stroppe Racing	Ford (2)	40	100.8 (161.28)	1:30:36	66.754
1997	October 5	Butch Gilliland (2)	Bill Stroppe Racing (2)	Ford (3)	40	100.8 (161.28)	1:34:00	64.34
1998	October 11	Kevin Harvick	Spears Motorsports	Chevrolet (3)	51	99.4 (159.04)	1:26:32	68.921
1999 – 2005	Not held							
2006	June 24	Brian Vickers	Hendrick Motorsports	Chevrolet (4)	64	127.4 (203.84)	1:53:03	67.595
2007	June 23	David Gilliland	Sunrise Ford Racing	Ford (4)	64	127.4 (203.84)	2:12:47	57.549
2008	June 21	Jason Bowles	Sunrise Ford Racing (2)	Ford (5)	68*	135.32 (216.512)	2:20:24	57.829
2009	June 20	Jason Bowles (2)	Sunrise Ford Racing (3)	Ford (6)	64	127.4 (203.84)	2:11:01	58.325
2010	June 19	Andrew Ranger	NDS Motorsports	Chevrolet (5)	64	127.4 (203.84)	1:50:30	69.155
2011	June 25	Joey Logano	Joe Gibbs Racing	Toyota	64	127.4 (203.84)	2:05:07	61.076
2012	June 23	David Gilliland (2)	Naake-Klauer Motorsports	Chevrolet (6)	64	127.4 (203.84)	1:50:50	68.947
2013	June 22	Derek Thorn	Sunrise Ford Racing (4)	Ford (7)	66*	131.34 (210.144)	2:02:34	64.295
2014	June 21	Kyle Larson	Turner Scott Motorsports	Chevrolet (7)	66*	131.34 (210.144)	2:12:28	59.49
2015	June 27	David Mayhew	McGowan Motorsports Inc.	Chevrolet (8)	68*	135.32 (216.512)	2:03:13	65.894
2016	June 25	Chase Elliott	HScott Motorsports	Chevrolet (9)	64	127.4 (203.84)	1:58:03	64.732
2017	June 24	Kevin Harvick (2)	Jefferson Pitts Racing	Ford (8)	64	127.4 (203.84)	2:08:43	59.368
2018	June 23	Will Rodgers	Jefferson Pitts Racing (2)	Ford (9)	64	127.4 (203.84)	2:10:40	58.482
2019	June 22	Noah Gragson	Jefferson Pitts Racing (3)	Chevrolet (10)	57*	143.64 (231.166)	2:36:47	54.97
2020	June 13	Cancelled due to the COVID-19 pandemic						
2021	June 5	Chase Briscoe	Chad Bryant Racing	Ford (10)	51*	128.52 (206.832)	1:58:23	65.138
2022	June 11	Jake Drew	Sunrise Ford Racing (5)	Ford (11)	56*	111.14 (179.350)	1:51:39	59.896
2023	June 9	Ryan Preece	Stewart–Haas Racing	Ford (12)	64	127.36 (204.998)	1:21:38	68.595
2024	June 7	Sam Mayer	Sigma Performance Services	Chevrolet (11)	67*	133.33 (214.574)	1:57:37	68.016
2025	July 11	William Sawalich	Joe Gibbs Racing (2)	Toyota (2)	65*	129.35 (208.169)	1:50:20	70.246
2026	June 26	Sam Corry	Nitro Motorsports	Toyota (3)	47	93.20 (150)	1:17:01	72.723

- 2008, 2013–2015, 2019, 2021 and 2024–2025: Race extended due to an overtime finish.
- 2022: Race shortened to 56 laps due to time constraints.

== See also ==
- Toyota/Save Mart 350 (Cup Series Race)
- Pit Boss/FoodMaxx 250 (O'Reilly Auto Parts Series Race)
- DoorDash 250 (Former Truck Series Race)

Previous race: NAPA Auto Care 150	ARCA Menards Series West; General Tire 150	Next race: Portland 112
