= West Series races at Irwindale =

ARCA Menards Series West races at Irwindale Speedway

ARCA Menards Series West races at Irwindale
ARCA Menards Series West
- Venue: Irwindale Speedway
- Location: Irwindale, California, United States
- First race: 1999
- Last race: 2024
- Distance: 75 mi (120.701 km)
- Laps: 150
- Previous names: First races Irwindale 250 presented by Jan's Towing (1999); Home Depot 250 (2000); Food 4 Less 250 (2001); Jani-King 200 (2002); King Taco 200 (2003, 2006–2007, 2009–2010); NAPA 150 presented by Southern California Pipe Trades (2004); King Taco 150 (2005); California Highway Patrol 200 (2008); Southern California Toyota Dealers 200 (2011); NAPA Auto Parts 150 (2014, 2021-2022); King Taco Catering / NAPA Auto Parts 150 (2015); Toyota / NAPA Auto Parts 150 (2016); NAPA Auto Parts Twin 100 (2017); ENEOS NAPA Auto 150 (2019); ENEOS 125 presented by NAPA Auto Parts (2020); Second races Snap-on 250 Benefitting City of Hope (1999); Home Depot 250 (2000); Food 4 Less 250 (2001); NAPA 150 presented by So Cal Pipe Trades (2004); King Taco 200 (2006); Pipe Careers 200 presented by Pipe Trades (2008); NAPA Auto Parts Twin 100 (2017); NAPA Auto Parts 150 presented by Sunrise Ford (2021); NAPA Auto Parts 150 presented by the West Coast Stock Car Motorsports Hall of Fame (2022); NAPA Auto Parts BlueDEF 150 presented by the West Coast Stock Car Motorsports Hall of Fame (2023); Former third races Home Depot 300 (2000); Jani-King 250 presented by NAPA (2001)
- Most wins (driver): Austin Cameron (5)
- Most wins (manufacturer): Chevrolet (15)

Circuit information
- Surface: Asphalt
- Length: 0.50 mi (0.80 km)
- Turns: 4

The ARCA Menards Series West held several races at Irwindale Speedway in Irwindale, California over the years. The track previously had two races for the series which were both in July. Races at the track have varied from 50 miles to 150 miles in length.

== Past winners ==
=== ARCA Menards Series West ===
| Year | Date | Driver | Manufacturer | Race Distance | | Race Time | Average Speed (mph) |
| Year | Date | Driver | Manufacturer | Laps | Miles (km) | Race Time | Average Speed (mph) |
|---|---|---|---|---|---|---|---|
| 1999 | June 19 | Steve Portenga | Chevrolet | 250 | 125 (201.168) | 1:47:15 | 69.93 |
| 1999 | August 21 | Austin Cameron | Chevrolet (2) | 250 | 125 (201.168) | 2:00:42 | 62.138 |
| 2000 | June 24 | Bobby Dotter | Chevrolet (3) | 250 | 125 (201.168) | 1:45:50 | 70.866 |
| 2000 | August 19 | Joe Bean | Ford | 250 | 125 (201.168) | 1:34:24 | 79.449 |
| 2000 | November 11 | Bobby Dotter (2) | Chevrolet (4) | 305* | 150 (241.402) | 2:03:17 | 74.219 |
| 2001 | May 12 | Brendan Gaughan | Chevrolet (5) | 254* | 125 (201.168) | 1:36:16 | 77.909 |
| 2001 | July 21 | Brendan Gaughan (2) | Chevrolet (6) | 250 | 125 (201.168) | 1:25:11 | 88.045 |
| 2001 | September 10 | Brendan Gaughan (3) | Chevrolet (7) | 250 | 125 (201.168) | 1:39:55 | 75.063 |
| 2002 | July 26 | Austin Cameron (2) | Chevrolet (8) | 200 | 100 (160.934) | 1:18:53 | 76.062 |
| 2003 | July 26 | Scott Lynch | Dodge | 200 | 100 (160.934) | 1:22:03 | 73.126 |
| 2004 | July 31 | Austin Cameron (3) | Chevrolet (9) | 157* | 100 (160.934) | 1:02:55 | 74.861 |
| 2004 | October 23 | Austin Cameron (4) | Chevrolet (10) | 152* | 100 (160.934) | 1:00:16 | 75.664 |
| 2005 | July 23 | Steve Portenga (2) | Chevrolet (11) | 150 | 100 (160.934) | 1:08:52 | 65.344 |
| 2006 | May 27 | Andrew Myers | Chevrolet (12) | 200 | 100 (160.934) | 1:35:07 | 63.08 |
| 2006 | July 22 | Austin Cameron (5) | Chevrolet (13) | 200 | 100 (160.934) | 1:27:11 | 68.82 |
| 2007 | July 4 | Brian Ickler | Chevrolet (14) | 200 | 100 (160.934) | 1:24:29 | 71.02 |
| 2008 | July 4 | Jason Bowles | Ford (2) | 200 | 100 (160.934) | 1:21:43 | 73.424 |
| 2008 | August 16 | Jason Bowles (2) | Ford (3) | 200 | 100 (160.934) | 1:18:41 | 76.255 |
| 2009 | July 4 | Jason Bowles (3) | Ford (4) | 200 | 100 (160.934) | 1:19:47 | 75.204 |
| 2010 | July 3 | Auggie Vidovich | Chevrolet (15) | 200 | 100 (160.934) | 1:23:53 | 71.528 |
| 2011 | July 2 | Greg Pursley | Ford (5) | 200 | 100 (160.934) | 1:17:22 | 77.553 |
| 2012 - 2013 | Not held | | | | | | |
| 2014 | March 22 | Patrick Staropoli | Toyota | 150 | 75 (120.701) | 1:00:07 | 74.854 |
| 2015 | April 11 | Chris Eggleston | Toyota (2) | 150 | 75 (120.701) | 1:04:33 | 69.713 |
| 2016 | March 19 | Todd Gilliland | Toyota (3) | 150 | 75 (120.701) | 1:09:00 | 65.217 |
| 2017 | March 25 | Todd Gilliland (2) | Toyota (4) | 100 | 50 (80.467) | 0:41:11 | 72.845 |
| 2017 | March 25 | Todd Gilliland (3) | Toyota (5) | 100 | 50 (80.467) | 0:37:09 | 80.754 |
| 2018 | Not held | | | | | | |
| 2019 | March 30 | Trevor Huddleston | Ford (6) | 150 | 75 (120.701) | 1:09:05 | 65.139 |
| 2020 | July 4 | Jesse Love | Toyota (6) | 125 | 62.50 (100.584) | 0:50:16 | 74.602 |
| 2021 | July 3 | Jesse Love (2) | Toyota (7) | 150 | 75 (120.701) | 1:03:59 | 70.331 |
| 2021 | August 21 | Jesse Love (3) | Toyota (8) | 153* | 76.5 (123.1148) | 1:12:06 | 63.662 |
| 2022 | March 26 | Tanner Reif | Ford (7) | 153* | 76.5 (123.1148) | 0:58:04 | 79.047 |
| 2022 | July 2 | Jake Drew | Ford (8) | 154* | 77 (123.919) | 1:10:27 | 65.578 |
| 2023 | April 1 | Sean Hingorani | Toyota (9) | 150 | 75 (120.701) | 1:06:17 | 67.890 |
| 2023 | July 1 | Trevor Huddleston (2) | Ford (9) | 150 | 75 (120.701) | 0:52:54 | 85.066 |
| 2024 | July 4 | Sean Hingorani (2) | Toyota (10) | 150 | 75 (120.701) | 0:56:30 | 80.285 |
| 2024 | July 6 (postponed from March 30) | Sean Hingorani (3) | Toyota (11) | 152* | 77 (122.701) | 1:15:13 | 60.625 |

- 2000 (November race), 2001 (May race), 2004 (both races), 2021 (August race), 2022 (both races), 2024 (July 6 race): Race extended due to a Green–white–checker finish.
