= Altamont Raceway Park =

Race track in Tracy, California, United States

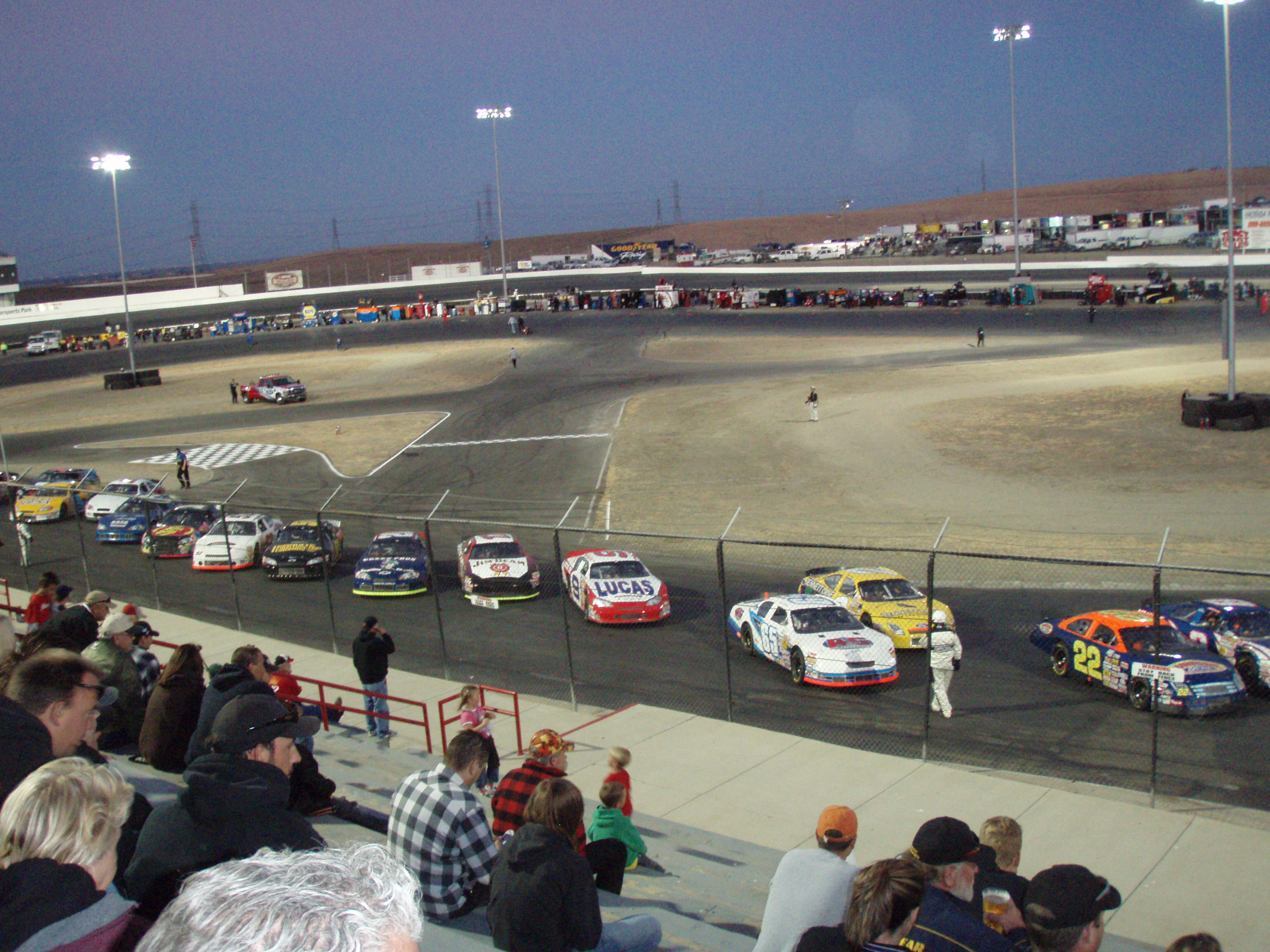
- 2007 Dan Gamel RV Centers 200 2007 Dan Gamel RV Centers 200
- Location: 17001 Midway Road; Tracy, California, U.S.
- Coordinates: 37°44′18″N 121°33′48″W
- Capacity: 7,500 (NASCAR)
- Owner: Riverside Motorsports Park, LLC
- Operator: Riverside Motorsports Park, LLC
- Opened: July 22, 1966
- Closed: October 2008
- Former names: Altamont Raceway Altamont Speedway Altamont Raceway Park
- Major events: NASCAR Camping World West Series; Dan Gamel RV Centers 200; NASCAR Whelen All-American Series

1/2 Mile Oval
- Length: 0.50 mi (0.8 km)
- Banking: Turns – 12 degrees Straights – 4 degrees

1/4 Mile Oval
- Length: 0.25 mi (0.4 km)

Road Course
- Length: 1.1 mi (1.8 km)

Altamont Raceway Park is a motorsports race track in the western United States, located in northern California, west of Tracy. It opened on July 22, 1966, and operated under the names Altamont Speedway, Altamont Raceway, Altamont Motorsports Park, Altamont Raceway Park and Arena, and Bernal Memorial Raceway. After 42 years' operation, the speedway closed in October 2008; the site is just south of the junction of Interstates 205 and 580.

== Description ==
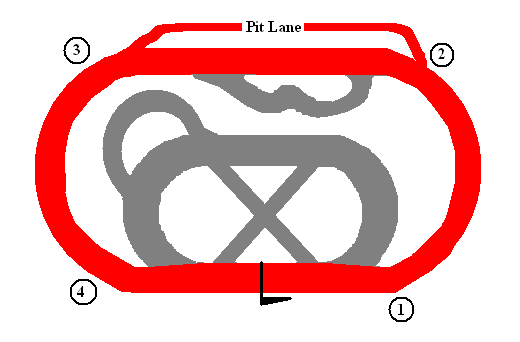
Diagram of Altamont Raceway Park

The Raceway Park contained a variety of different racetrack configurations including a 1/2 mile oval, 1/4 mile oval, 1.1-mile (1.8 km) road course, and a figure 8 track. The course was the state's largest oval racetrack north of Los Angeles.

The track featured a pit lane that was uncharacteristic when compared to larger ovals for the weekly events. The pit lane was located on the outside of the course on the opposite side of the oval from the start finish line. However, during Grand National West races, the pit lane was moved to the 1/4 mile oval so as to be inside the larger oval, as is customary for most oval tracks, since live pit stops are used during the higher-level NASCAR-sanctioned race.

== History ==
The park is well known for its December 6, 1969, hosting of the notorious and ill-fated Altamont Free Concert, featuring Santana, Jefferson Airplane, The Flying Burrito Brothers, Crosby, Stills, Nash & Young, and The Rolling Stones. During the Stones' set, Meredith Hunter, a concert-goer high on methamphetamine and brandishing his revolver, was stabbed to death by a member of the Hells Angels, which had been hired to provide security, in front of the stage as the band played. The death was captured on film and appears in the documentary Gimme Shelter (1970).

In 2004, the track appeared in an episode of the popular Discovery Channel show MythBusters. In the episode, the show's hosts Jamie Hyneman and Adam Savage used the track to test the myth that a car will have better fuel mileage with the air conditioner on and windows closed than it would with all of the windows down.

In 2006, the park came under the ownership of Riverside Motorsports Park, LLC. They initiated several upgrades to the park including fresh asphalt, the addition of the 1.1-mile (1.8 km) road course and the new Figure 8 track. Altamont staged a variety of motorsports events, including NASCAR Whelen All-American Series raced weekly as the schedule permitted for the California State and Whelen National Championships.

The park also played host to a race on the NASCAR Camping World West Series schedule, the Dan Gamel RV Centers 200 in the fall. Additionally, Formula 4, Sprint Cars, Motorcycle races and the 24 Hours of LeMons were held at the racetrack, the latter being a play on the famous 24 Hours of Le Mans. However, in the place of top dollar racing machines, the 24 Hours of LeMons features cars with a maximum price of $500 (excluding safety gear, brakes and tires), hence the title 'lemons'.

Since 2020 the track has been used to test autonomous electric cars by the company Zoox.
