= Ron Norman =

American racing driver (born 1969)

- Born: June 25, 1969 (age 57); Davenport, Iowa, U.S.

ARCA Menards Series West career
- 44 races run over 4 years
- Best finish: 11th (2016)
- First race: 2015 NAPA Auto Parts 150 (Kern County)
- Last race: 2018 NAPA Auto Parts 175 (Kern County)
Wins	Top tens	Poles
0	9	1
- Statistics up to date as of November 20, 2024.

Ron Norman (born June 25, 1969) is an American professional stock car racing driver and who has competed in the NASCAR K&N Pro Series West from 2015 to 2018.

Norman has also previously competed in series such as the ASA Late Model Series, the Rocky Mountain Challenge Series, and the United States Late Model Association, and is a frequent competitor at Tucson Speedway.

== Motorsports results ==
=== NASCAR ===
(key) (Bold - Pole position awarded by qualifying time. Italics - Pole position earned by points standings or practice time. * – Most laps led.)

==== K&N Pro Series West ====
NASCAR K&N Pro Series West results
Year	Team	No.	Make	1	2	3	4	5	6	7	8	9	10	11	12	13	14	NKNPSWC	Pts	Ref
2015	Nicklaus Sommer	30	Toyota	KCR; 26	IRW; 14	**TUS**; 12	IOW; 13	SHA; 23										12th	346	
2015	Nicklaus Sommer	30	Ford						SON; 30	SLS; 6	IOW; 13	EVG; 13	CNS; 11	MER; 18	AAS; 22	PHO; 26		12th	346	
2016	Kent Smith	30	Ford	IRW; 13	KCR; 11	TUS; 10	OSS; 7	CNS; 7	SON; 22	SLS; 15	IOW; 9	EVG; 12	DCS; 9	UMC	UMC	MER; 12	AAS; 11	11th	390	
2017	Norman Levin Racing	40	Chevy	TUS; 14	KCR; 14	IRW; 12	IRW; 11	SPO; 20	OSS; 13	CNS; 7		IOW; 23	EVG; 9	DCS; 18	MER; 11	AAS; 16	KCR; 24	12th	402	
2017	Norman Levin Racing	40	Ford								SON; 22							12th	402	
2018	Norman Levin Racing	40	Chevy	KCR; 13	TUS; 13	TUS; 10	OSS	CNS	SON	DCS; 10	IOW	EVG	GTW	LVS	MER	AAS	KCR; 15	14th	160	
