= Cassie Gannis =

American racing driver (born 1991)

- Nationality: American
- Born: April 7, 1991 (age 35) Phoenix, Arizona, U.S.

NASCAR K&N Pro Series West
- Years active: 2011–2012, 2018
- Teams: Greg Rayl, Nancy Cano, John Gomez, Patriot Motorsports Group
- Starts: 11
- Best finish: 22nd in 2012

Previous series
- 2015 2015: ARCA Racing Series; NASCAR Camping World Truck Series

Awards
- 2012: K&N Pro Series West Most Popular Driver Award

Cassandra Lynn Gannis (born April 7, 1991) is an American professional stock car racing driver.

== Racing career ==
Gannis started racing in quarter midgets in 1999; from 1999 to 2003, she recorded 15 top-fives in 18 races. In 2005, she started Legends car racing, and two years later, began racing super late models. At Tucson Raceway Park, she was the youngest female driver to race at the track.

From 2009 to 2011, Gannis was named a member of NASCAR's Drive for Diversity program. In 2010, she ran a USAR Pro Cup Series race at Langley Speedway, suffering mechanical problems and failing to complete a lap. A year later, she started racing in the K&N Pro Series West for Greg Rayl, recording a best finish of 16th at Colorado National Speedway and Spokane County Raceway. The following year, she raced for Rayl, Nancy Cano and John Gomez, with her best finish being 15th at Havasu 95 Speedway. She eventually won the series' Most Popular Driver Award.

In 2013, Gannis auditioned for a spot in the PEAK Stock Car Dream Challenge, a contest with the prize being a ride with Michael Waltrip Racing, and was named a finalist.

In 2015, Gannis tested for Carter 2 Motorsports in the ARCA Racing Series at Daytona International Speedway, and eventually joined the team to make her series debut at the season-opening Lucas Oil 200. Despite being 33rd fastest in a field of 49 drivers, she failed to qualify for the race. On November 6, Gannis announced that she would make her Camping World Truck Series debut in the Lucas Oil 150 at Phoenix International Raceway for Mike Harmon Racing, but once again, she failed to qualify.

In 2019, Gannis attempted to qualify for a women's-only Formula 3 series, but failed to progress beyond the evaluation day.

== Personal life ==
Gannis works as a veterinarian technician at a Phoenix-based animal hospital. A spokeswoman for the Boys & Girls Clubs of Arizona, she is a speaker on teen driving safety; she also works as a host for HopeKids of AZ and a member of the Cystic Fibrosis Foundation's Arizona branch board. She often visits military bases, being awarded the Safety Chesty Award Certificate of Commendation. Asides from racing, she works as a ride-along driver for the Rusty Wallace Racing Experience. Her sister played college basketball at the University of Portland and is a firefighter for the City of Phoenix.

== Motorsports career results ==
=== NASCAR ===
(key) (Bold – Pole position awarded by qualifying time. Italics – Pole position earned by points standings or practice time. * – Most laps led.)

==== Camping World Truck Series ====
NASCAR Camping World Truck Series results
Year	Team	No.	Make	1	2	3	4	5	6	7	8	9	10	11	12	13	14	15	16	17	18	19	20	21	22	23	NCWTC	Pts	Ref
2015	Mike Harmon Racing	49	Ram	DAY	ATL	MAR	KAN	CLT	DOV	TEX	GTW	IOW	KEN	ELD	POC	MCH	BRI	MSP	CHI	NHA	LVS	TAL	MAR	TEX	PHO; DNQ	HOM	116th	-	

==== K&N Pro Series West ====
NASCAR K&N Pro Series West results
Year	Team	No.	Make	1	2	3	4	5	6	7	8	9	10	11	12	13	14	15	NKNPSWC	Pts	Ref
2011	Greg Rayl	07	Ford	PHO	AAS	MMP	IOW	LVS	SON	IRW; 23	EVG	PIR	CNS; 16	MRP	SPO; 16	AAS			39th	358	
2011	Greg Rayl	70	Ford														PHO; DNQ		39th	358	
2012	Nancy Cano	01	Ford	PHO; DNQ	LHC; 15	MMP; 23	S99; 19	IOW	BIR										22nd	130	
2012	Greg Rayl	07	Ford							LVS; 24	SON	EVG	CNS	IOW	PIR	SMP	AAS		22nd	130	
2012	John Gomez	22	Chevy															PHO; 22	22nd	130	
2018	Patriot Motorsports Group	08	Chevy	KCR	TUS; 16	TUS; 15	OSS												24th	86	
2018	Patriot Motorsports Group	36	Chevy					CNS; 15	SON	DCS	IOW	EVG	GTW	LVS	MER	AAS	KCR		24th	86	

=== ARCA Racing Series ===
(key) (Bold – Pole position awarded by qualifying time. Italics – Pole position earned by points standings or practice time. * – Most laps led.)

ARCA Racing Series results
Year	Team	No.	Make	1	2	3	4	5	6	7	8	9	10	11	12	13	14	15	16	17	18	19	20	ARSC	Pts	Ref
2015	Carter 2 Motorsports	95	Dodge	DAY; DNQ	MOB	NSH	SLM	TAL	TOL	NJE	POC	MCH	CHI	WIN	IOW	IRP	POC	BLN	ISF	DSF	SLM	KEN	KAN	NA	-	

^{*} Season still in progress
^{1} Ineligible for series points
