= Derek Thorn =

American racing driver (born 1986)

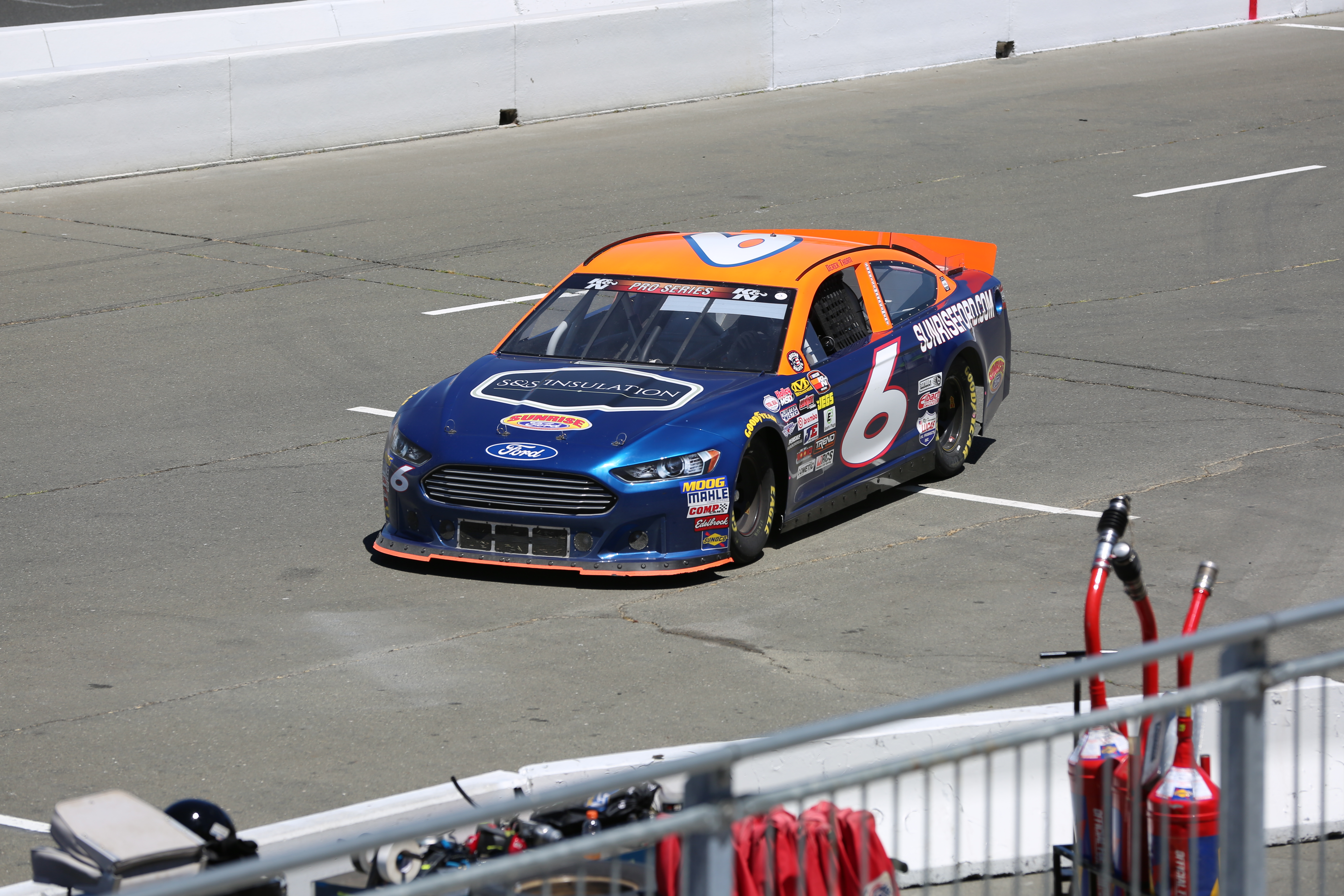
- Thorn's car on pit road at Sonoma Raceway in 2018
- Nationality: American
- Born: April 25, 1986 (age 40)

K&N Pro Series West career
- Debut season: 2008
- Current team: Sunrise Ford Racing
- Car number: 6
- Engine: Ford
- Former teams: Shawn Keep Racing, Byron Campbell Motorsports, Bill McAnally Racing
- Starts: 51
- Championships: 2
- Wins: 7
- Poles: 5
- Best finish: 1st in 2013, 2018
- Finished last season: 1st (2018)

Championship titles
- 2022 2019 2013, 2018 2012–13, 2017 2017: Snowball Derby; Snowflake 100; NASCAR K&N Pro Series West; SRL Southwest Tour; Winter Showdown

Awards
- 36 (as of 2019): Winningest SRL Southwest Tour driver
- Statistics up to date as of December 7, 2019.

Derek Thorn (born April 25, 1986) is an American professional stock car racing driver. He currently competes full-time in the SRL Southwest Tour and the ASA STARS National Tour. He won the championship in the NASCAR K&N Pro Series West with Sunrise Ford Racing in 2013 and again in 2018 in a one-off season with SFR. In 2022, Thorn won the 55th Annual Snowball Derby.

== Motorsports career results ==
=== Racing career summary ===
Season	Series	Team	Races	Wins	Top 5	Top 10	Points	Position
2008	NASCAR Camping World West Series	Shawn Keep	0	0	0	0	0	N/A
2008	NASCAR Camping World East Series	Shawn Keep	6	0	1	2	797	23rd
2011	NASCAR K&N Pro Series West	Byron Campbell Motorsports	3	0	2	2	869	16th
2011	NASCAR K&N Pro Series West	Sunrise Ford Racing	3	0	2	2	869	16th
2012	NASCAR K&N Pro Series West	Sunrise Ford Racing	15	2	10	12	568	**3rd**
2013	NASCAR K&N Pro Series West	Sunrise Ford Racing	15	3	12	14	622	**1st**
2013	NASCAR Nationwide Series	Jimmy Means Racing	0	0	0	0	0	N/A
2017	NASCAR K&N Pro Series West	Bill McAnally Racing	1	0	0	0	54	31st
2017	NASCAR K&N Pro Series West	Sunrise Ford Racing	1	0	0	1	54	31st
2018	NASCAR K&N Pro Series West	Sunrise Ford Racing	14	2	13	14	586	**1st**
2020	CARS Super Late Model Tour	N/A	1	0	0	0	0	N/A
2023	ASA STARS National Tour	Paul Shafer Motorsports	3	0	1	2	158	22nd
2024	ASA STARS National Tour	Paul Shafer Motorsports	1	0	0	0	39	59th
2025	ASA STARS National Tour	Highlands Motorsports	12	0	2	4	558	7th
2026	ASA STARS National Tour	Highlands Motorsports	11	0	1	5		

=== NASCAR ===
(key) (Bold – Pole position awarded by qualifying time. Italics – Pole position earned by points standings or practice time. * – Most laps led. ** – All laps led.)

==== Nationwide Series ====
NASCAR Nationwide Series results
Year	Team	No.	Make	1	2	3	4	5	6	7	8	9	10	11	12	13	14	15	16	17	18	19	20	21	22	23	24	25	26	27	28	29	30	31	32	33	NNSC	Pts	Ref
2013	Jimmy Means Racing	52	Toyota	DAY	PHO	LVS	BRI	CAL	TEX	RCH; DNQ	TAL	DAR	CLT	DOV	IOW	MCH	ROA	KEN	DAY	NHA	CHI	IND	IOW	GLN	MOH	BRI	ATL	RCH	CHI	KEN	DOV	KAN	CLT	TEX	PHO	HOM	N/A	0	

==== K&N Pro Series East ====
NASCAR K&N Pro Series East results
Year	Team	No.	Make	1	2	3	4	5	6	7	8	9	10	11	12	13	NKNPSEC	Pts	Ref
2008	Shawn Keep	80	Ford	GRE; 24	IOW; DNQ	SBO; 20	GLN	NHA; 24	TMP	MCM; 5	ADI	LRP	MFD; 7	NHA; 15	DOV	STA	23rd	797	

==== K&N Pro Series West ====
NASCAR K&N Pro Series West results
Year	Team	No.	Make	1	2	3	4	5	6	7	8	9	10	11	12	13	14	15	NKNPSWC	Pts	Ref
2008	Shawn Keep	80	Ford	AAS	PHO	CTS	IOW; DNQ	CNS	SON	IRW	DCS	EVG	MMP	IRW	AMP	AAS			N/A	0	
2011	Byron Campbell Motorsports	44	Chevy	PHO; 3	AAS	MMP	IOW	LVS; 28	SON	IRW; 2	EVG								16th	869	
2011	Sunrise Ford Racing	9	Ford									PIR; 3	CNS	MRP	SPO	AAS; 11	PHO; 5		16th	869	
2012	Sunrise Ford Racing	6	Ford	PHO; 5	**LHC**; 1*	MMP; 12	S99; 7	IOW; 5	BIR; 4	LVS; 14	SON; 2	EVG; 3	CNS; 2		PIR; 5	SMP; 1	AAS; 4	PHO; 27	3rd	568	
2012	Sunrise Ford Racing	66	Ford											IOW; 10					3rd	568	
2013	Sunrise Ford Racing	6	Ford	PHO; 4	S99; 1**	BIR; 2*	IOW; 5	L44; 4	SON; 1	**CNS**; 1*	IOW; 4	EVG; 3*	SPO; 2	**MMP**; 9	**SMP**; 2	**AAS**; 2*	KCR; 6	PHO; 15	1st	622	
2017	Bill McAnally Racing	43	Toyota	TUS	KCR	IRW	IRW	SPO	OSS	CNS	SON; 28	IOW	EVG	DCS	MER	AAS			31st	54	
2017	Sunrise Ford Racing	22	Ford														KCR; 6		31st	54	
2018	Sunrise Ford Racing	6	Ford	KCR; 2	TUS; 2	TUS; 3	OSS; 2	CNS; 1*	SON; 8	**DCS**; 5	IOW; 2	EVG; 1	GTW; 3	LVS; 3	MER; 4	AAS; 3	KCR; 5		1st	586	

=== CARS Super Late Model Tour ===
(key)

CARS Super Late Model Tour results
Year	Team	No.	Make	1	2	3	4	5	6	7	8	CSLMTC	Pts	Ref
2020	N/A	43T	Toyota	SNM	HCY	JEN	HCY	FCS	BRI	FLC	NSH; 22*	N/A	0	

=== ASA STARS National Tour ===
(key) (Bold – Pole position awarded by qualifying time. Italics – Pole position earned by points standings or practice time. * – Most laps led. ** – All laps led.)

ASA STARS National Tour results
Year	Team	No.	Make	1	2	3	4	5	6	7	8	9	10	11	12	ASNTC	Pts	Ref
2023	Paul Shafer Motorsports	7T	Chevy	**FIF**; 23	MAD											22nd	158	
2023	Paul Shafer Motorsports	7	Toyota			NWS; 9	HCY	MLW	AND	WIR	TOL	WIN				22nd	158	
2023	Paul Shafer Motorsports	7T	Toyota										**NSV**; 2			22nd	158	
2024	Paul Shafer Motorsports	7	N/A	NSM	FIF	HCY	MAD	MLW	AND	OWO	TOL	WIN	NSV; 21			59th	39	
2025	Highlands Motorsports	96T	Chevy	NSM; 14	FIF; 12											7th	558	
2025	Highlands Motorsports	96	Ford			DOM; 2	HCY; 13	NPS; 15	MAD; 10	SLG; 10	AND; 18	OWO; 12	TOL; 15	WIN; 18	NSV; 3	7th	558	
2026	Highlands Motorsports	96	Ford	NSM; 18	FIF; 21	HCY; 6	SLG; 11	MAD; 5	NPS; 8	OWO; 10	TRI; 15	WIN; 8	NSV; 18	NSM; 21		-*	-*	

Sporting positions
Preceded by Dylan Kwasniewski; Todd Gilliland	NASCAR K&N Pro Series West Champion; 2013; 2018	Succeeded by Greg Pursley; Derek Kraus
