= Cole Rouse =

American racing driver (born 1997)

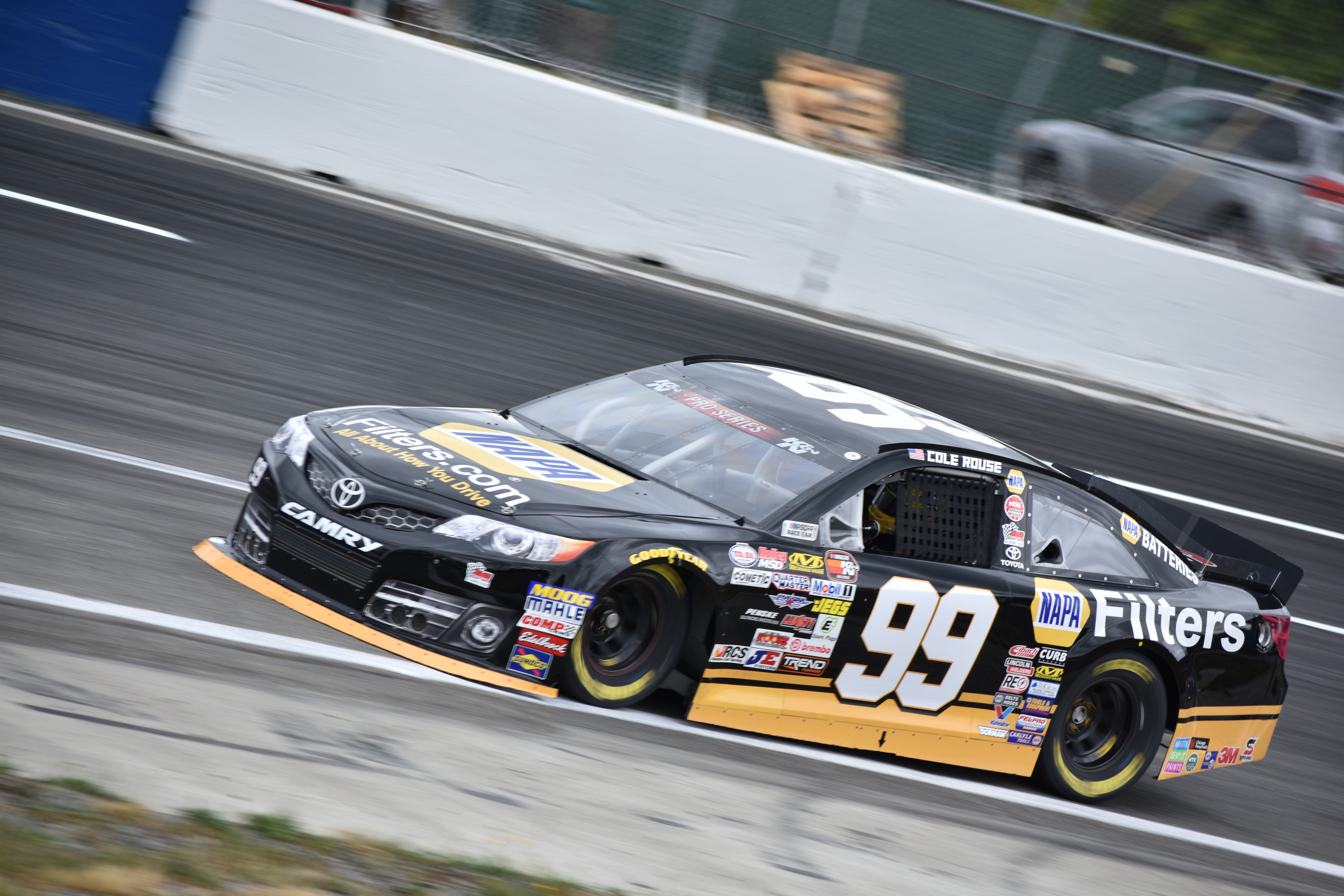
- Rouse's No. 99 NAPA Filters Toyota at Evergreen Speedway in 2018, where he finished second.
- Nationality: American
- Born: July 8, 1997 (age 29)

NASCAR K&N Pro Series East career
- Debut season: 2018
- Years active: 2018–present
- Teams: Bill McAnally Racing
- Starts: 6
- Championships: 0
- Wins: 0
- Poles: 0
- Finished last season: 16th

NASCAR K&N Pro Series West career
- Debut season: 2016
- Years active: 2016, 2018
- Teams: Bill McAnally Racing
- Starts: 28
- Championships: 0
- Wins: 1
- Poles: 1
- Best finish: 3rd in 2018

NASCAR O'Reilly Auto Parts Series career
- 1 race run over 1 year
- 2018 position: 66th
- Best finish: 66th (2018)
- First race: 2018 DC Solar 300 (Las Vegas)
Wins	Top tens	Poles
0	0	0
- Statistics up to date as of November 17, 2018.

Cole Rouse (born July 8, 1997) is an American former professional stock car racing driver. He last competed full-time in the NASCAR K&N Pro Series West and part-time in the NASCAR K&N Pro Series East, driving the No. 99 Toyota Camry for Bill McAnally Racing in both series. He is from Fort Smith, Arkansas.

== Racing career ==
Beginning in the mini-cup ranks, Rouse eventually progressed to late model racing.

Rouse's NASCAR career began in the NASCAR K&N Pro Series West. He made his debut for Bob Bruncati's Sunrise Ford Racing in 2016. Rouse then left the K&N Pro Series West to compete for Kyle Busch Motorsports in the 2017 CARS Super Late Model Tour. He later joined Venturini Motorsports to compete in two ARCA Racing Series events at the end of the 2017 season.

Rouse returned to the K&N Pro Series West in 2018 to compete for Bill McAnally Racing. He also drove for the team in select NASCAR K&N Pro Series East races, including the season-opener at New Smyrna Speedway, where he finished second behind Todd Gilliland.

On September 15, 2018, he made his NASCAR Xfinity Series debut, piloting the No. 78 for B. J. McLeod Motorsports. He finished an impressive 21st place after avoiding some of the carnage late in the going.

On October 13, 2018, Rouse took pole position and converted it into his first career K&N Pro Series win at All American Speedway.

== Motorsports career results ==
=== Career summary ===
Season	Series	Team	Car No.	Races	Wins	Top fives	Top tens	Poles	Laps led	Position	Points	Ref
2016	NASCAR K&N Pro Series West	Sunrise Ford Racing	6	14	0	4	12	0	0	8th	509	
2017	CARS Super Late Model Tour	Kyle Busch Motorsports	51R, 99R, 74, 51	11	2	5	9	3	208	1st	328	
2017	ARCA Racing Series	Venturini Motorsports	15	2	0	0	0	0	0	55th	340	
2018	NASCAR K&N Pro Series East	Bill McAnally Racing	99	6	0	2	4	0	0	16th	204	
2018	NASCAR K&N Pro Series West	Bill McAnally Racing	99	14	1	7	13	1	159	3rd	557	

=== NASCAR ===
(key) (Bold – Pole position awarded by qualifying time. Italics – Pole position earned by points standings or practice time. * – Most laps led.)

==== Xfinity Series ====
NASCAR Xfinity Series results
Year	Team	No.	Make	1	2	3	4	5	6	7	8	9	10	11	12	13	14	15	16	17	18	19	20	21	22	23	24	25	26	27	28	29	30	31	32	33	NXSC	Pts	Ref
2018	B. J. McLeod Motorsports	78	Chevy	DAY	ATL	LVS	PHO	CAL	TEX	BRI	RCH	TAL	DOV	CLT	POC	MCH	IOW	CHI	DAY	KEN	NHA	IOW	GLN	MOH	BRI	ROA	DAR	IND	LVS; 21	RCH	CLT	DOV	KAN	TEX	PHO	HOM	66th	16	

==== K&N Pro Series East ====
NASCAR K&N Pro Series East results
Year	Team	No.	Make	1	2	3	4	5	6	7	8	9	10	11	12	13	14	NKNPSEC	Pts	Ref
2018	Bill McAnally Racing	99	Toyota	NSM; 2	BRI; 21	LGY	SBO	SBO	MEM; 18	NJM	TMP	NHA; 10	IOW; 8	GLN	GTW; 2	NHA	DOV	16th	204	

==== K&N Pro Series West ====
NASCAR K&N Pro Series West results
Year	Team	No.	Make	1	2	3	4	5	6	7	8	9	10	11	12	13	14	NKNPSWC	Pts	Ref
2016	Sunrise Ford Racing	6	Ford	IRW; 9	KCR; 3	TUS; 4	OSS; 14	CNS; 9	SON; 10	SLS; 6	IOW; 5	EVG; 6	DCS; 12	MMP; 10	MMP; 9	MER; 4	AAS; 6	8th	509	
2018	Bill McAnally Racing	99	Toyota	KCR; 3	TUS; 7	TUS; 4	OSS; 3	CNS; 6	SON; 12	DCS; 6	IOW; 8	EVG; 2	GTW; 2	LVS; 6	MER; 2	**AAS**; 1	KCR; 7	3rd	557	

=== ARCA Racing Series ===
(key) (Bold – Pole position awarded by qualifying time. Italics – Pole position earned by points standings or practice time. * – Most laps led.)

ARCA Racing Series results
Year	Team	No.	Make	1	2	3	4	5	6	7	8	9	10	11	12	13	14	15	16	17	18	19	20	ARSC	Pts	Ref
2017	Venturini Motorsports	15	Toyota	DAY	NSH	SLM	TAL	TOL	ELK	POC	MCH	MAD	IOW	IRP	POC	WIN	ISF	ROA	DSF	SLM	CHI	KEN; 11	KAN; 13	55th	340	

=== CARS Super Late Model Tour ===
(key)

CARS Super Late Model Tour results
Year	Team	No.	Make	1	2	3	4	5	6	7	8	9	10	11	12	13	CSLMTC	Pts	Ref
2017	Kyle Busch Motorsports	51R	Toyota	CON; 3	DOM; 6	DOM; 8	HCY; 11	HCY; 2			ROU; 1		**ROU**; 3*	HCY; 18	CON; 1*		1st	328	
2017	Kyle Busch Motorsports	99R	Toyota						BRI; 7	AND							1st	328	
2017	Kyle Busch Motorsports	74	Toyota									TCM; 6					1st	328	
2017	Kyle Busch Motorsports	51	Toyota													SBO; 10	1st	328	
