= 2018 NAPA Auto Parts Idaho 208 =

NASCAR race

Race details
- Race 12 of 14 in the 2018 NASCAR K&N Pro Series West season
- Date: September 29, 2018
- Location: Meridian Speedway in Meridian, Idaho
- Course: Permanent racing facility
- Course length: .250 miles (0.402 km)
- Distance: 208 laps, 52 mi (83.68 km)
- Average speed: 48.916 miles per hour (78.723 km/h)

Pole position
Driver	Derek Kraus	Bill McAnally Racing
- Time: 13.244

Most laps led
Driver	Derek Kraus	Bill McAnally Racing
- Laps: 189

Winner
No. 19	Hailie Deegan	Bill McAnally Racing

Television in the United States
- Network: NBCSN
- Announcers: Dave Burns and Brandon McReynolds

The 2018 NAPA Auto Parts Idaho 208 was a NASCAR K&N Pro Series West race held at Meridan Speedway in Meridian, Idaho. Hailie Deegan won the race, the first ever victory by a female in K&N Pro Series history. Her Bill McAnally Racing teammates Cole Rouse and Derek Kraus finished second and third respectively. Kraus won the pole and led the most laps, leading the first 189 of 208.

== Report ==
=== Race ===
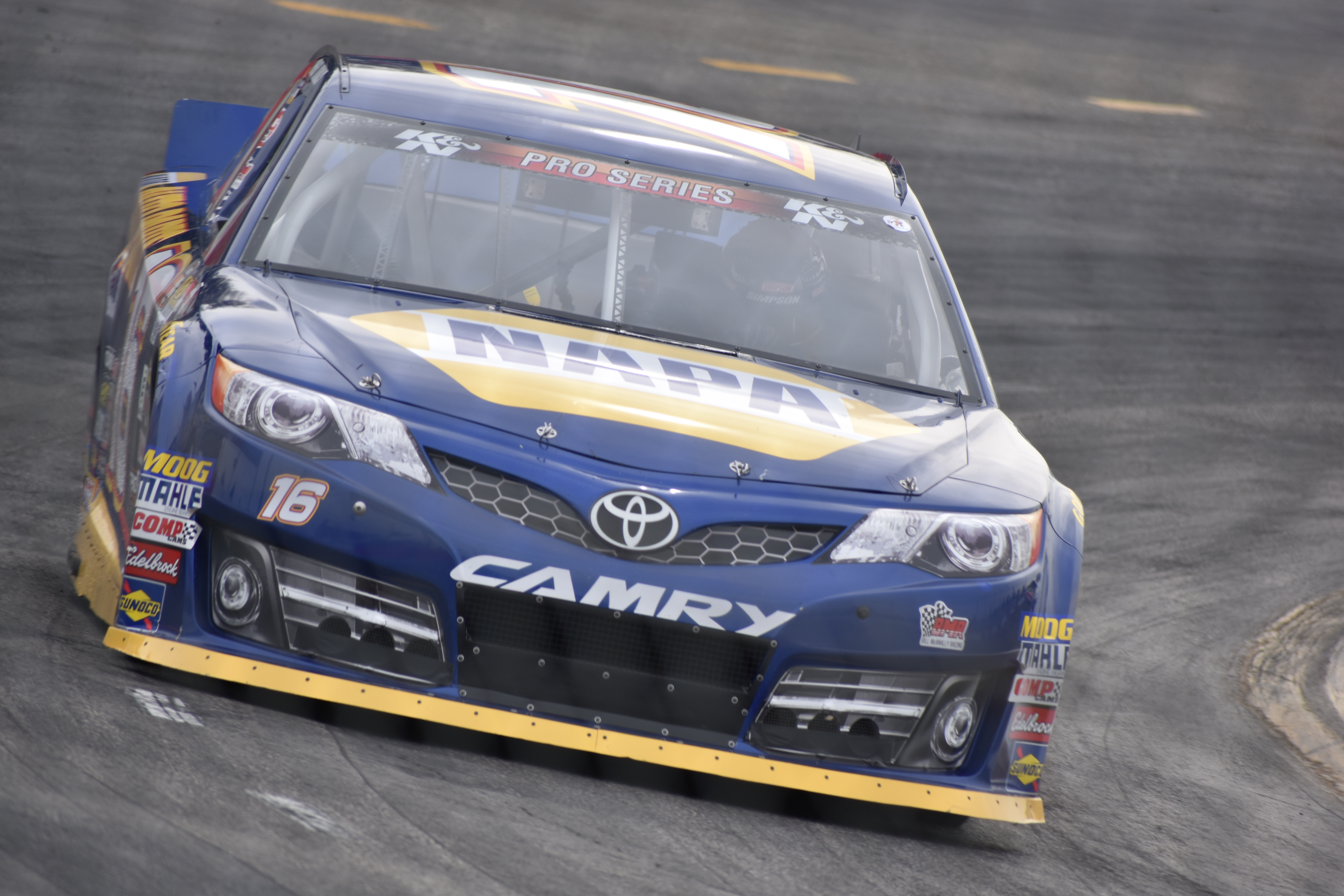
Kraus scored his fifth K&N West pole of the season and led the first 189 of 208 laps.

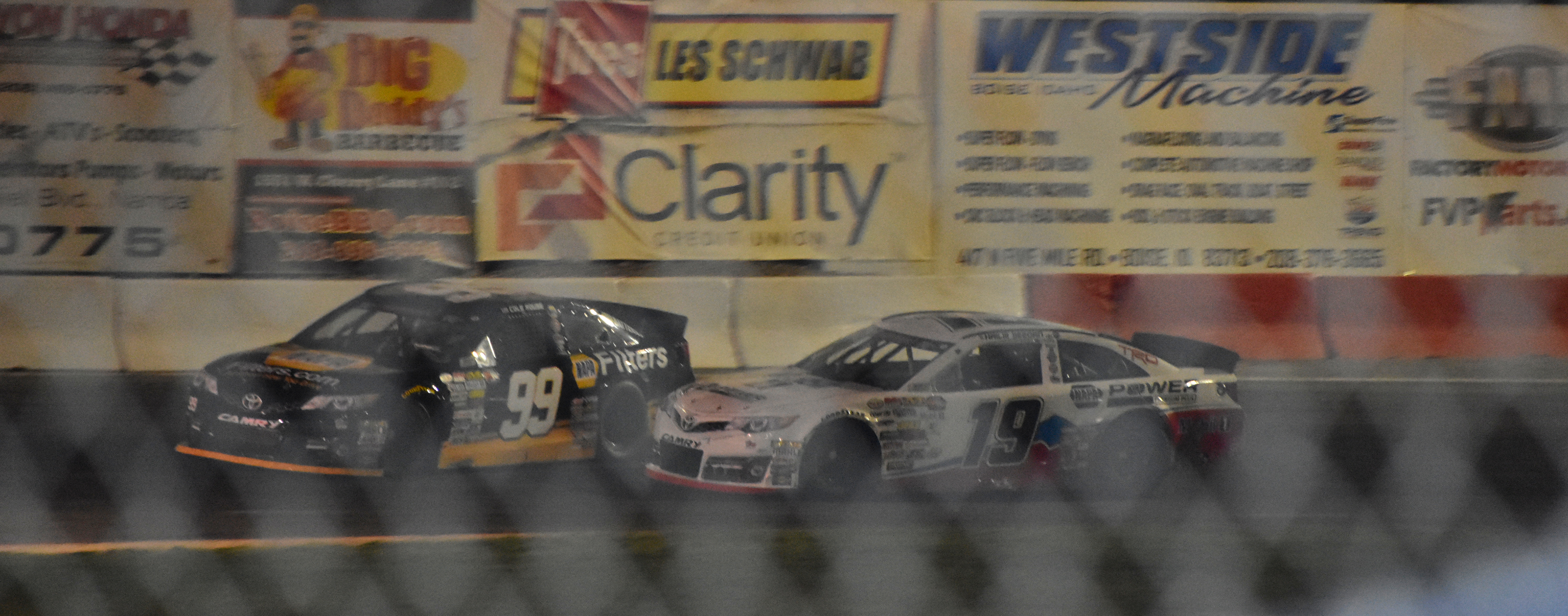
Deegan's last lap bump on Rouse to score her first K&N West victory, becoming the first female to win a NASCAR touring race since Shawna Robinson in 1989.

Derek Kraus took the pole and led the first 189 laps. With 20 laps to go, Taylor Canfield, who was making his series debut, spun in front of Kraus and blocked the racetrack. Kraus tried to avoid him but hit the outside wall and lost the lead to his Bill McAnally Racing teammate Cole Rouse. After the ensuing caution, Rouse held the lead until the final lap of the race, when Hailie Deegan tapped his left-rear quarter panel in turn one, making a last-lap pass. Deegan went on to score the win, the first of her career, while Rouse and Kraus finished second and third to complete a podium sweep for BMR. Deegan led only the final lap.

=== Post-race ===
"I was in bed last night thinking, 'If it comes down, last lap, I'm in second, I'm a car length off of him, what am I going to do?' And I found that Turn 1 spot. I knew what exactly I had to do there. I was doing it to some other people just getting right under them to get them a little light to get them, not wrecking loose, nothing crazy, but enough to just get a little under them....we executed, and we made it happen."

— Deegan, speaking after the race.

Deegan's victory was her first career win and the first win by a female in history at the K&N Pro Series West level of NASCAR. Deegan was ecstatic after the win, explaining, "This has to be the best day of my life right here. It doesn't get any better than this. People don't understand how many days, how many hours I've put into this. How much work I've done to get to this moment. It’s just amazing ... this is the happiest day of my life."

Immediately following the race, Rouse expressed displeasure with Deegan's bump and run-style pass on the final lap, saying, "We were going into Turn 1...and she doesn't lift and drives into me, gets me completely sideways. We were going to win that race if it was run clean, but unfortunately it wasn't." He continued by saying he would race Deegan hard the last two races of the season: "I'm just going to go into the next two races, not give her any slack and we're going to win both of those. It was a good night, but I don't really care about second, honestly." The next day, however, Rouse tweeted that he "got over it quick" and called Deegan "an amazing girl and amazing talent", adding, "I'm happy for her! She made history and I'm a part of it." Kraus, meanwhile, was unhappy due to the incident with Canfield (Canfield's third of the night). "We led 190+ laps, then a lapped car spun again. I was predicting he was going to roll down because he didn't have his brakes on yet. But he stayed there, and I was already committed [to the top]...and I guess NASCAR ruled me third. I don't know, I guess we'll go onto Roseville and Kern and win them two."

== Results ==
=== Qualifying ===
Grid	No.	Driver	Team	Manufacturer	Time	Speed
1	16	Derek Kraus	Bill McAnally Racing	Toyota	13.244	67.955
2	9	Ryan Partridge	Sunrise Ford Racing	Ford	13.257	67.889
3	99	Cole Rouse	Bill McAnally Racing	Toyota	13.344	67.446
4	19	Hailie Deegan	Bill McAnally Racing	Toyota	13.353	67.401
5	6	Derek Thorn	Sunrise Ford Racing	Ford	13.418	67.074
6	27	Jeff Jefferson	Jefferson Pitts Racing	Ford	13.431	67.009
7	22	Trevor Huddleston	Sunrise Ford Racing	Ford	13.481	66.761
8	10	Matt Levin	Levin Racing	Chevrolet	13.524	66.548
9	43	Kody Vanderwal	Patriot Motorsports Group	Ford	13.544	66.450
10	91	Kyle Tellstrom	Patriot Motorsports Group	Toyota	13.752	65.445
11	77	Andrew Koens	Performance P-1 Motorsports	Toyota	13.757	65.421
12	11	Takuma Koga	John Krebs Racing	Chevrolet	13.802	65.208
13	08	Travis Milburn	Patriot Motorsports Group	Chevrolet	13.881	64.837
14	36	Sting Ray Robb	Patriot Motorsports Group	Chevrolet	14.072	63.957
15	32	Taylor Canfield	Patriot Motorsports Group	Toyota	14.447	62.168

=== Race results ===
Pos	Grid	No.	Driver	Team	Manufacturer	Laps	Led	Status	Points
1	4	19	Hailie Deegan	Bill McAnally Racing	Toyota	208	1	Running	47^{1}^{3}
2	3	99	Cole Rouse	Bill McAnally Racing	Toyota	208	18	Running	43^{1}
3	1	16	Derek Kraus	Bill McAnally Racing	Toyota	208	189	Running	43^{2}
4	5	6	Derek Thorn	Sunrise Ford Racing	Ford	208	0	Running	40
5	2	9	Ryan Partridge	Sunrise Ford Racing	Ford	208	0	Running	39
6	7	22	Trevor Huddleston	Sunrise Ford Racing	Ford	207	0	Running	38
7	8	10	Matt Levin	Levin Racing	Chevrolet	207	0	Running	37
8	6	27	Jeff Jefferson	Jefferson Pitts Racing	Ford	207	0	Running	36
9	9	43	Kody Vanderwal	Patriot Motorsports Group	Ford	207	0	Running	35
10	14	36	Sting Ray Robb	Patriot Motorsports Group	Chevrolet	206	0	Running	34
11	11	77	Andrew Koens	Performance P-1 Motorsports	Toyota	205	0	Running	33
12	15	32	Taylor Canfield	Patriot Motorsports Group	Toyota	182	0	Running	32
13	13	08	Travis Milburn	Patriot Motorsports Group	Chevrolet	151	0	Oil line	31
14	12	11	Takuma Koga	John Krebs Racing	Chevrolet	47	0	Drive shaft	30
15	10	91	Kyle Tellstrom	Patriot Motorsports Group	Chevrolet	14	0	Engine	29
^{1} Includes one bonus point for leading a lap
^{2} Includes two bonus points for leading the most laps
^{3} Includes three bonus points for winning the race

== Standings after the race ==
Rank	+/–	Driver	Points
1		Derek Thorn	505
2		Ryan Partridge	473 (–32)
3		Cole Rouse	473 (–32)
4		Derek Kraus	466 (–39)
5	1	Hailie Deegan	438 (–67)
6	1	Trevor Huddleston	430 (–75)
7		Kody Vanderwal	412 (–93)
8		Matt Levin	354 (–151)
9		Takuma Koga	333 (–172)
10		Todd Souza	237 (–268)

- Note: Only the top ten positions are included for the driver standings.
