= General Tire 150 =

General Tire 150 may refer to several ARCA Menards Series races:

- General Tire 150 (Charlotte), a race at Charlotte Motor Speedway, first held in 1996
- General Tire 150 (Dover), a race at Dover Motor Speedway, first held in 1998 and last held in 2025
- General Tire 150 (Kentucky), a race at Kentucky Speedway, first held in 2000 and last held in 2020
- General Tire 150 (Phoenix), a race at Phoenix Raceway, first held in 2020
- General Tire 150 (Sonoma), a West Series race at Sonoma Raceway, first held in 1969
