= SRL Southwest Tour =

Late model stock car racing league

StockCar Racing League
- Sport: Stock car racing
- Jurisdiction: United States
- Founded: 2001
- Headquarters: Bakersfield, California

Official website
- www.srlsouthwesttour.com
- (United States)

The StockCar Racing League is a late model stock car racing league operating since 2001. The series is a continuation of the Tri-Track Challenge run in California between 1997 and 2000. The series is also connected to the former Supermodified Racing League, previously headed by Davey Hamilton. Through the years the series expanded its racing calendar as well as racing series adding spec late model series and Legends car racing.

== History ==
=== Tri-Track Challenge ===
Starting in 1997, Madera Speedway, Stockton 99 Speedway and Altamont Motorsports Park started cooperating to form the Tri-Track Challenge for their late model racing classes. Eric Holmes raced in the series in 1998. The 1999 season was won by Burney Lamar, despite only winning a single race at Stockton. Terpstra, Fensler, Holmes and Tucker completed the top five. After the 2000 season, won by Jim Pettit, II, the series was disbanded. The main reason being Stockton 99 Speedway not wanting to continue to support the series.

=== Supermodified Racing League ===
In January 2001, the promoters of Altamont and Madera tried to found a series using the same rules as the existing NASCAR Elite Division. Davey Hamilton and Rick Gerhardt, promoting a California-based supermodified racing division under the Supermodified Racing League sanctioning body offered to sanction the new late model series under their umbrella. The SRL Wild West Shootout Late Model Series was founded for the 2001 season with Altamont and Madera running six races each. Stockton returned on the calendar for the 2002 season. Gerhardt sold his interest in the series at the beginning of 2004 to Steve Fensler. For 2005 the supermodified division was sold to form the Western States Supermodified Racing League. The late model series continued under the management of Fensler.

=== SRL Southwest Tour ===
For 2006, the SRL Southwest Tour was formed in affiliation with the ASA. After the announcement that the NASCAR Elite Division would be disbanded after the 2006 season the NASCAR organisation encouraged the Elite Division teams to join the SRL series.

Legends car racing was introduced in the SRL series in 2010. With spec legends cars built by US Legend Cars the series was run following the INEX regulations. Cale Kanke won the first two seasons before graduating into the Southwest Tour in 2015. In 2011 Sean Rayhall and Ben Rhodes were some of the guest starters in the series. Despite attracting large grids, the series was discontinued after the 2015 season.

For 2013, the S2 class was introduced, later renamed as the spec late model class. The series focused on young drivers coming from go-karts or legends racing. The first season was won by Ryan Cansdale who later graduated into the main Southwest Tour. The 2014 season was won by Brandon Weaver.

In 2022, it was announced that SRL would sanction races at Citrus County Speedway, Mobile International Speedway, and Berlin Raceway as the SRL National Tour. In 2023, the schedule was expanded to eight races at different tracks, Bubba Pollard was crowned the inaugural champion. In 2024, the series became independent of SRL and became the UARA National Tour joining the UARA Sportsman Series.

A pre-season non-championship race, the SRL Winter Showdown, was introduced in 2015. The race at Kern County Raceway Park invited many non-SRL racers to compete for the crown. New to the SRL series were Dustin Ash, Preston Peltier, Dalton Sargeant among others. South-eastern based short track specialist Bubba Pollard won the first two editions of the race.

== Classes ==
=== SRL Southwest Tour ===
The main series is a super late model stock car based class, with cars similar to those used at major Super Late Model races such as the Snowball Derby, All American 400, Anderson 400, and other such major events on the short track racing scene. The series is open to any chassis fabricator such as Lefthander, LFR or Howe. The bodies, based on late model cars by Chevrolet, Ford, Dodge or Toyota.

=== Racecar Factory Spec Late Model Touring Series ===
The spec late model class (also known as the S2 class) is a class for spec racing late model stock cars. The cars ar built by the Racecar Factory based in Irwindale, California. The tube chassis is slightly smaller than a regular (super) late model car. The body is provided by Fivestar RaceCar Bodies and is similar to the ones used in the Mid-American Stock Car Series and the NASCAR PEAK Mexico Series. The spec engine is provided by General Motors. The Chevrolet Performance CT350 crate engine produces 350hp. The engine is a Chevrolet small-block in a V8 configuration.

== StockCar Racing League Champions (1997–present) ==
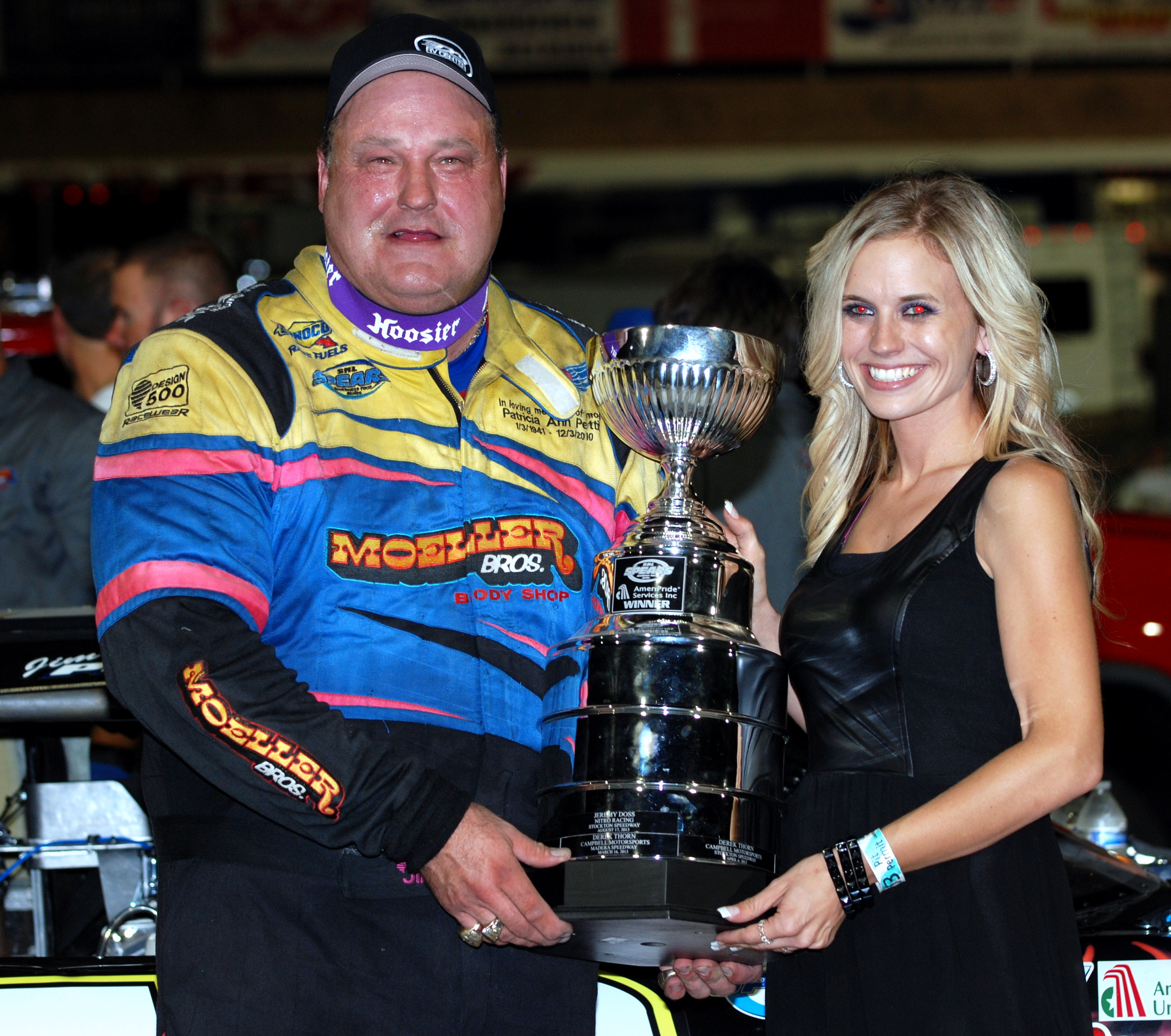
Multiple champion Jim Pettit II with the 2013 Kern County race trophy.

=== Tri-Track Challenge (1997–2000) ===
Year	Tri-Track Challenge
1997	Dave Byrd
1998	Mike David
1999	Burney Lamar
2000	Jim Pettit II

=== Supermodified Racing League (2000–2005) ===
Year	Wildwest Shootout	Supermodified	Lites
2000	n/a	Troy Regier	n/a
2001	Nathan Tucker	Troy Regier (2)	n/a
2002	Jeff Anthony	Lonnie Adamson	Darrell Herzog
2003	Ron Strmiska Jr	n/a	n/a
2004	Steve Belletto	Troy Regier (3)	n/a
2005	Jason Fensler	n/a	n/a

=== StockCar Racing League (2006–present) ===
Year	Southwest Tour	Pro Late Model	Modifieds	Spec Late Model	Legends
2006	Eric Schmidt	n/a	Jason Patison	n/a	n/a
2007	Dave Byrd (2)	n/a	Danny Gay	n/a	n/a
2008	Jim Pettit II (2)	n/a	Jimmy Dickerson	n/a	n/a
2009	M.K. Kanke	n/a	Andrew Phipps	n/a	n/a
2010	Jonathan Gomez	n/a	Jim Mardis	n/a	Cale Kanke
2011	Jim Pettit II (3)	n/a	Jim Mardis (2)	n/a	Cale Kanke (2)
2012	Derek Thorn	n/a	Austin Barnes	n/a	Darren Amidon
2013	Jim Pettit II (4)	n/a	Chris Gerchman	Ryan Cansdale	Ricky Schlick
2014	Derek Thorn (2)	n/a	Dylan Cappello	Brandon Weaver	Tony Mangini
2015	Jacob Gomes	n/a	Austin Barnes (2)	Dylan Garner	Cody Winchell
2016	Derek Thorn (3)	n/a	Matthew Hicks	Todd Conrad	n/a
2017	Derek Thorn (4)	n/a	Taylor Miinch	Robby Hornsby	n/a
2018	Jeremy Doss	n/a	Taylor Miinch (2)	n/a	n/a
2019	Cole Moore	n/a	Dylan Cappello (2)	n/a	n/a
2020	Derek Thorn (5)	n/a	Jeremy Doss	n/a	n/a
2021	Derek Thorn (6)	Jeremy Doss	Jeremy Doss (2)	n/a	n/a
2022	Jacob Gomes (2)	Seth Wise	Jaron Giannini	n/a	n/a
2023	Jacob Gomes (3)	Linny White	Travis Thirkettle	n/a	n/a
2024	Buddy Shepherd	Christian Bazen	Holly Clark	n/a	n/a

=== SRL Winter Showdown ===
Year	Super Late Model	Modified
2015	Bubba Pollard	Dylan Cappello
2016	Bubba Pollard (2)	Ryan Partridge
2017	Derek Thorn	Austin Barnes
2018	Kyle Busch	n/a
2019	Ty Majeski	Trevor Cristiani
2020	n/a	n/a
2021	Derek Thorn (2)	Jeremy Doss
2022	Jacob Gomes	n/a
2023	Jacob Gomes (2)	n/a

== SRL National Tour/UARA National Tour Champions (2021–present) ==
Year	Super Late Model	Sportsman
2022	n/a	Steven Morris
2023	Bubba Pollard	Steve Gill

== 2025 UARA National Tour Schedule ==
Date	Track	Location	Winner
February 1	Cordele Motor Speedway (Note: Race #1 of Speed Fest at Cordele)	Cordele, Georgia	Bubba Pollard
March 15	South Alabama Speedway (Note: Rattler 250)	Ozark, Alabama	
April 5	Cordele Motor Speedway (Note: Race #2 of Speed Fest at Cordele)	Cordele, Georgia	
May 10	Cordele Motor Speedway (Note: Race #3 of Speed Fest at Cordele)	Cordele, Georgia	
May 24	Freedom Factory (Note: Bigley Memorial Tune Up 125)	Bradenton, Florida	
June 4	Berlin Raceway (Note: Money in the Bank 150)	Marne, Michigan	
June 19	Jennerstown Speedway (Note: Motor Mountain Masters 150)	Jennerstown, Pennsylvania	
August 2	Auburndale Speedway (Note: Billy Joe Ingram Memorial 154)	Winter Haven, Florida	
August 13	Berlin Raceway (Note: Battle at Berlin 250)	Marne, Michigan	
October 4	Cordele Motor Speedway (Note: Race #4 of Speed Fest at Cordele)	Cordele, Georgia	
October 25	Cordele Motor Speedway (Note: World Crown 300)	Cordele, Georgia	
November 29	Freedom Factory (Note: Bill Bigley Sr. Memorial 128)	Bradenton, Florida	

== See also ==
- ASA
- ASA Midwest Tour
- ACT
- CRA
- CRA Super Series
- CARS Tour
- PASS
