= Takuma Koga (racing driver) =

Japanese auto racing driver (born 1977)

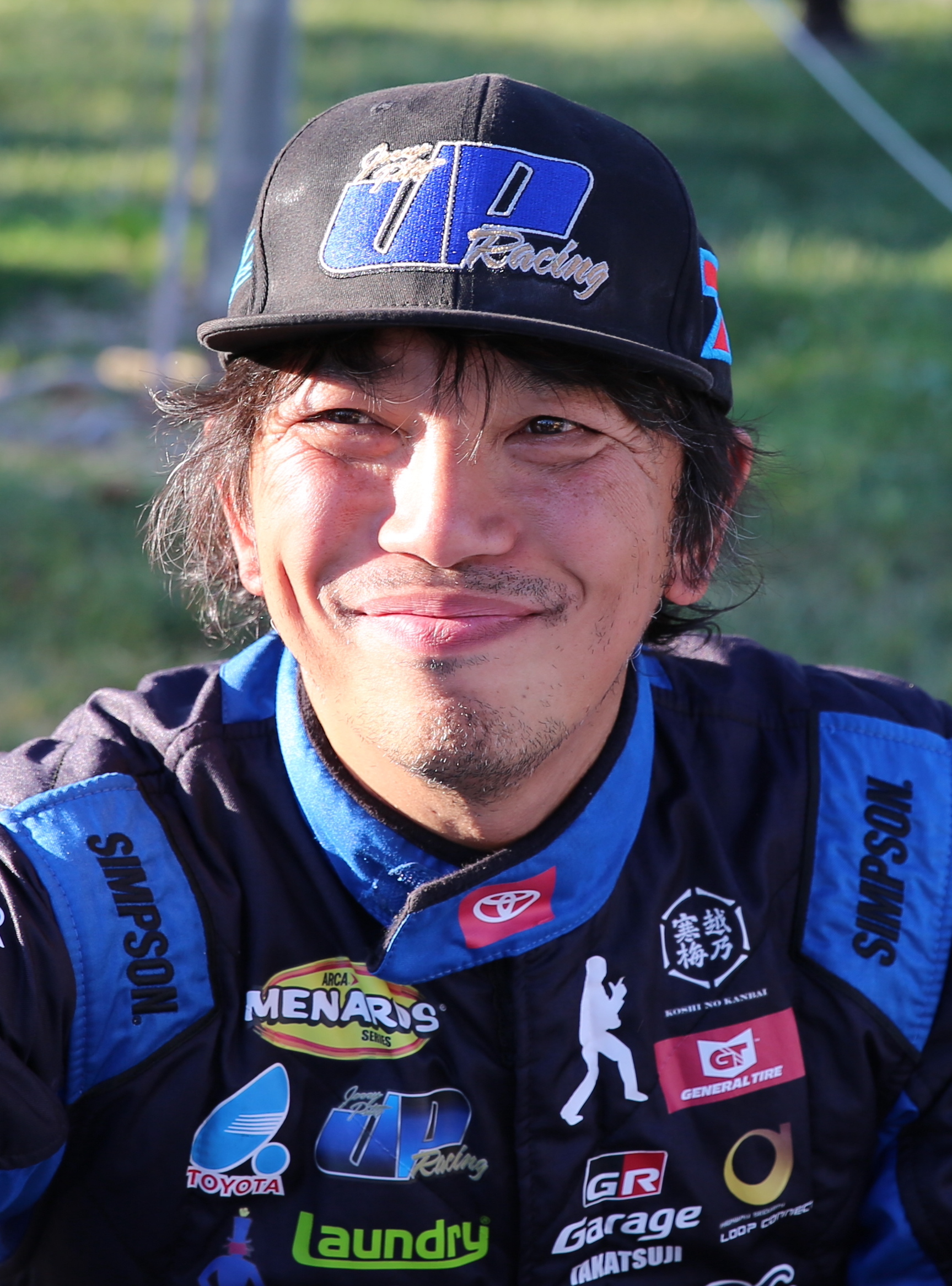
- Koga at All American Speedway in 2024
- Born: April 16, 1977 (age 49); Nagoya, Aichi, Japan

NASCAR O'Reilly Auto Parts Series career
- 2 races run over 1 year
- 2025 position: 69th
- Best finish: 69th (2025)
- First race: 2025 Pacific Office Automation 147 (Portland)
- Last race: 2025 IAA and Ritchie Bros. 250 (Martinsville)
Wins	Top tens	Poles
0	0	0

ARCA Menards Series career
- 33 races run over 7 years
- ARCA no., team: No. 12 (Fast Track Racing)
- Best finish: 4th (2026)
- First race: 2020 General Tire 150 (Phoenix)
- Last race: 2026 Menards 150 (Kansas)
Wins	Top tens	Poles
0	1	0

ARCA Menards Series East career
- 12 races run over 2 years
- ARCA East no., team: No. 12 (Fast Track Racing)
- Best finish: 5th (2025)
- First race: 2025 Pensacola 150 (Pensacola)
- Last race: 2026 Bush's Best 200 (Bristol)
Wins	Top tens	Poles
0	2	0

ARCA Menards Series West career
- 126 races run over 15 years
- ARCA West no., team: No. 12 (Fast Track Racing)
- Best finish: 6th (2022)
- First race: 2002 Coors Light 200 (Evergreen)
- Last race: 2026 General Tire 150 (Phoenix)
Wins	Top tens	Poles
0	28	0
- Statistics up to date as of September 25, 2026.

Takuma Koga (Japanese: 古賀 琢麻, Hepburn: Koga Takuma; born April 16, 1977) is a Japanese professional stock car racing driver who currently competes full-time in the ARCA Menards Series, driving the No. 12 Toyota Camry for Fast Track Racing. He has previously competed in the NASCAR Xfinity Series.

== Racing career ==
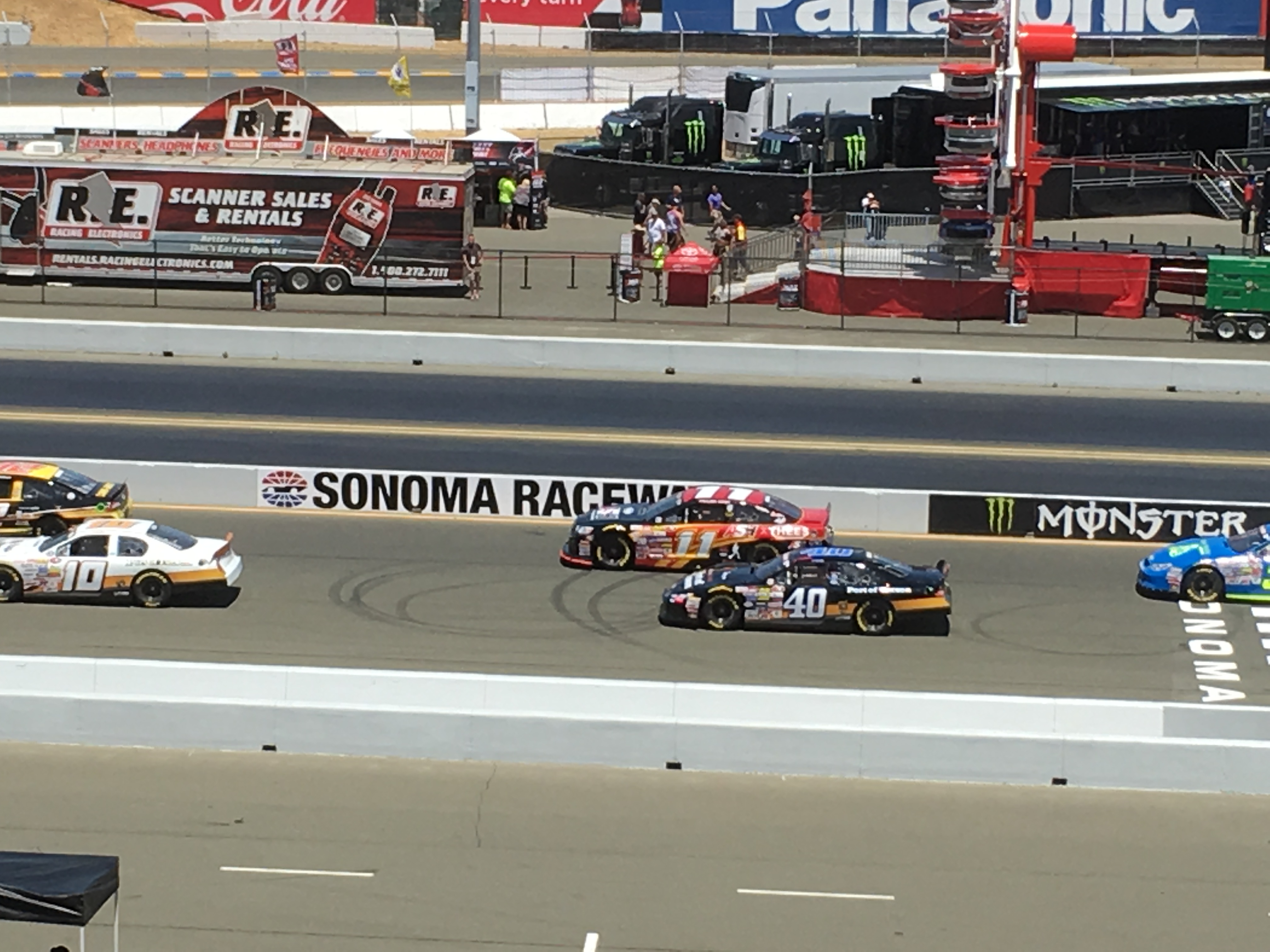
Koga (No. 11) racing Matt Levin (No. 10), Ron Norman (No. 40) and other cars in the West Series race at Sonoma in 2017

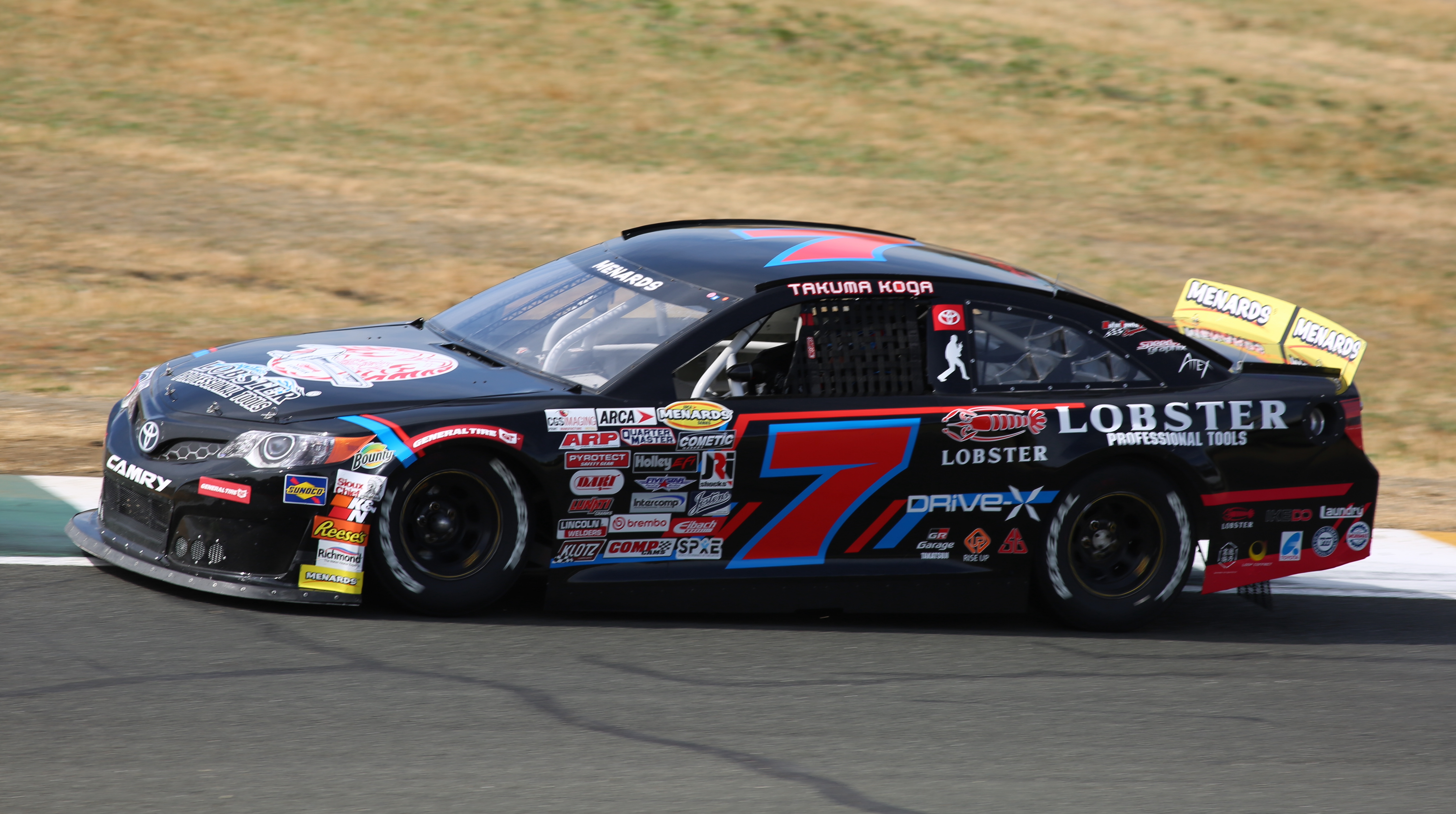
Koga's No. 7 car at Sonoma Raceway in 2023.

Koga began competing in NASCAR in 2001 in the NASCAR Northwest Series, where he attempted six races, qualifying for five and failing to qualify for one. After competing in partial K&N West Series schedules between 2002 and 2016, Koga ran his first full season in 2017. That year, he also scored a career-best fifth-place finish at Orange Show Speedway. In December 2018, Koga announced he would be joining Performance P-1 Motorsports for the 2019 season. He remained with the team for the 2020 season in the renamed ARCA Menards Series West. Koga left Performance P-1 for the 2021 season, and joined Jerry Pitts Racing to drive their No. 7 car full-time, which switched from Ford to Toyota starting that year. The team was formerly Jefferson Pitts Racing before the team's two co-owners, Jeff Jefferson and Jerry Pitts, split up to each have their separate teams.

On February 21, 2022, an article from Yahoo! Japan revealed that Koga would attempt to make his NASCAR Xfinity Series debut at some point in 2022, driving for MBM Motorsports. However, this did not end up happening.

On January 30, 2025, Koga moved to the ARCA Menards Series East where he would run the No. 12 Fast Track Racing Toyota for the full season. Later that year, it was revealed that Koga would make his Xfinity Series debut driving for Joey Gase Motorsports with Scott Osteen in the No. 53 Toyota. He was not entered for Dover, but he did, in fact, enter for Portland, but in the No. 35, where he finished in 29th.

On December 12, 2025, it was revealed that Koga will drive the full ARCA Menards Series schedule, driving the No. 12 for FTR.

== Motorsports career results ==
=== Stock car career summary ===
Season	Series	Team	Races	Wins	Top 5	Top 10	Points	Position
2002	NASCAR Winston West Series	Midgley Racing	2	0	0	0	236	33rd
2003	NASCAR Winston West Series	Midgley Racing	4	0	0	0	397	24th
2004	NASCAR West Series	Midgley Racing	3	0	0	0	482	25th
2005	NASCAR West Series	Midgley Racing	11	0	0	0	1227	14th
2006	NASCAR Autozone West Series	Midgley Racing	5	0	0	0	455	22nd
2016	NASCAR K&N Pro Series West	John Krebs Racing	4	0	0	0	103	24th
2017	NASCSR K&N Pro Series West	John Krebs Racing	14	0	1	1	389	13th
2018	NASCAR K&N Pro Series West	John Krebs Racing	14	0	0	1	399	9th
2019	NASCAR K&N Pro Series West	Performance P–1 Motorsports	14	0	0	3	420	8th
2020	ARCA Menards Series West	Performance P–1 Motorsports	11	0	0	6	509	7th
2020	ARCA Menards Series	Performance P–1 Motorsports	1	0	0	0	31	67th
2021	ARCA Menards Series West	Jerry Pitts Racing	9	0	1	4	378	8th
2021	ARCA Menards Series	Jerry Pitts Racing	1	0	0	0	21	110th
2022	ARCA Menards Series West	Jerry Pitts Racing	11	0	2	5	490	6th
2022	ARCA Menards Series	Jerry Pitts Racing	1	0	0	0	26	100th
2023	ARCA Menards Series West	Jerry Pitts Racing	12	0	0	4	516	9th
2023	ARCA Menards Series	Jerry Pitts Racing	1	0	0	0	25	106th
2024	ARCA Menards Series West	Jerry Pitts Racing	12	0	0	4	522	7th
2024	ARCA Menards Series	Fast Track Racing	1	0	0	0	53	68th
2024	ARCA Menards Series	Jerry Pitts Racing	1	0	0	0	53	68th
2025	ARCA Menards Series East	Fast Track Racing	8	0	1	2	315	5th
2025	ARCA Menards Series	Fast Track Racing	7	0	0	0	152	26th
2025	NASCAR Xfinity Series	Joey Gase Motorsports with Scott Osteen	2	0	0	0	9	69th
2026	ARCA Menards Series West	Fast Track Racing	1	0	0	0	21	80th
2026	ARCA Menards Series East	Fast Track Racing	4	0	0	0	87	27th
2026	ARCA Menards Series	Fast Track Racing	20	0	0	1	753	4th

=== NASCAR ===
(key) (Bold – Pole position awarded by qualifying time. Italics – Pole position earned by points standings or practice time. * – Most laps led.)

==== Xfinity Series ====
NASCAR Xfinity Series results
Year	Team	No.	Make	1	2	3	4	5	6	7	8	9	10	11	12	13	14	15	16	17	18	19	20	21	22	23	24	25	26	27	28	29	30	31	32	33	NXSC	Pts	Ref
2025	Joey Gase Motorsports with Scott Osteen	35	Toyota	DAY	ATL	COA	PHO	LVS	HOM	MAR	DAR	BRI	CAR	TAL	TEX	CLT	NSH	MXC	POC	ATL	CSC	SON	DOV	IND	IOW	GLN	DAY	PIR; 29	GTW	BRI	KAN	ROV	LVS	TAL	MAR; 37	PHO	69th	9	

=== ARCA Menards Series ===
(key) (Bold – Pole position awarded by qualifying time. Italics – Pole position earned by points standings or practice time. * – Most laps led.)

ARCA Menards Series results
Year	Team	No.	Make	1	2	3	4	5	6	7	8	9	10	11	12	13	14	15	16	17	18	19	20	AMSC	Pts	Ref
2020	Performance P-1 Motorsports	77	Toyota	DAY	PHO; 13	TAL	POC	IRP	KEN	IOW	KAN	TOL	TOL	MCH	DAY	GTW	L44	TOL	BRI	WIN	MEM	ISF	KAN	67th	31	
2021	Jerry Pitts Racing	7	Toyota	DAY	PHO; 23	TAL	KAN	TOL	CLT	MOH	POC	ELK	BLN	IOW	WIN	GLN	MCH	ISF	MLW	DSF	BRI	SLM	KAN	110th	21	
2022	Jerry Pitts Racing	7	Toyota	DAY	PHO; 18	TAL	KAN	CLT	IOW	BLN	ELK	MOH	POC	IRP	MCH	GLN	ISF	MLW	DSF	KAN	BRI	SLM	TOL	100th	26	
2023	Jerry Pitts Racing	7	Toyota	DAY	PHO; 19	TAL	KAN	CLT	BLN	ELK	MOH	IOW	POC	MCH	IRP	GLN	ISF	MLW	DSF	KAN	BRI	SLM	TOL	106th	25	
2024	Fast Track Racing	01	Toyota	DAY; DNQ																				68th	53	
2024	Jerry Pitts Racing	7	Toyota		PHO; 23	TAL	DOV	KAN	CLT	IOW	MOH	BLN	IRP	SLM	ELK	MCH	ISF	MLW	DSF	GLN	BRI			68th	53	
2024	Fast Track Racing	12	Toyota																			KAN; 15	TOL	68th	53	
2025	Fast Track Racing	12	Ford	DAY; 25	PHO	TAL	KAN	CLT	MCH	BLN	ELK	LRP												26th	152	
2025	Fast Track Racing	12	Toyota										DOV; 15	IRP; 31	IOW; 22	GLN	ISF	MAD	DSF	BRI; 33	SLM	KAN; 16	TOL; 14	26th	152	
2026	Fast Track Racing	12	Toyota	DAY; 16	PHO; 23	KAN; 19	TAL; 14	GLN; 16	TOL; 20	MCH; 18	POC; 12	BER; 12	ELK; 9	CHI; 16	LRP; 19	IRP; 19	IOW; 27	ISF; 15	MAD; 11	DSF; 11	SLM; 13	BRI; 24	KAN; 13	4th	753	

==== ARCA Menards Series East ====
ARCA Menards Series East results
Year	Team	No.	Make	1	2	3	4	5	6	7	8	AMSEC	Pts	Ref
2025	Fast Track Racing	12	Toyota	FIF; 11	CAR; 15	NSV; 7	FRS; 3	DOV; 15	IRP; 31	IOW; 22	BRI; 33	5th	315	
2026	Fast Track Racing	12	Toyota	HCY	CAR	NSV	TOL; 20	IRP; 19	FRS	IOW; 27	BRI; 24	27th	86	

==== ARCA Menards Series West ====
ARCA Menards Series West results
Year	Team	No.	Make	1	2	3	4	5	6	7	8	9	10	11	12	13	14	AMSWC	Pts	Ref
2002	Midgley Racing	09	Pontiac	PHO	LVS	CAL	KAN	EVG; 14	IRW; 16	S99	RMR	DCS	LVS					33rd	236	
2003	Midgley Racing	09	Chevy	PHO; 28	LVS; 19	CAL	MAD	TCR	EVG	IRW; 17	S99	RMR	DCS	PHO	MMR; 21			24th	397	
2004	Midgley Racing	09	Chevy	PHO; 23	MMR; 11	CAL	S99	EVG; DNQ	IRW; DNQ	S99	RMR	DCS	PHO	CNS	MMR	IRW; 22		25th	482	
2005	Midgley Racing	09	Chevy	PHO; 30	MMR; 21	PHO; 27	S99; Wth	IRW; 26	EVG; 17	S99; 14	PPR; 16		DCS; 16	CTS; 11	MMR; 26			14th	1227	
2005	Midgley Racing	09	Pontiac									CAL; 20						14th	1227	
2006	Midgley Racing	09	Chevy	PHO	PHO	S99; 21	IRW; 17	SON; 31	DCS	IRW	EVG	S99; 19						22nd	455	
2006	Midgley Racing	09	Pontiac										CAL; 32	CTS	AMP			22nd	455	
2016	John Krebs Racing	11	Chevy	IRW; 17	KCR; 23	TUS	OSS	CNS	SON; 13	SLS	IOW	EVG; 20	DCS	MMP	MMP	MER	AAS	24th	103	
2017	John Krebs Racing	11	Chevy	KCR; 16	TUS; 19	IRW; 16	IRW; 19	SPO; 14	OSS; 5	CNS; 16	SON; 21	IOW; 29	EVG; 18	DCS; 11	MER; 12	AAS; 14	KCR; 17	13th	389	
2018	John Krebs Racing	11	Chevy	KCR; 20	TUS; 17	TUS; 16	OSS; 12	CNS; 14	SON; 25		IOW; 15	EVG; 14	GTW; 20	LVS; 16	MER; 14	AAS; 10	KCR; 12	9th	399	
2018	John Krebs Racing	11	Toyota							DCS; 12								9th	399	
2019	Performance P-1 Motorsports	77	Toyota	LVS; 17	IRW; 19	TUS; 15	TUS; 9	CNS; 10	SON; 17	DCS; 10	IOW; 18	EVG; 16	GTW; 11	MER; 15	AAS; 13	KCR; 11	PHO; 15	8th	420	
2020	Performance P-1 Motorsports	77	Toyota	LVS; 11	MMP; 14	MMP; 14	IRW; 10	EVG; 9	DCS; 8	CNS; 9	LVS; 6	AAS; 9	KCR; 12	PHO; 23				7th	509	
2021	Jerry Pitts Racing	7	Toyota	PHO; 23	SON; 11	IRW; 16	CNS; 15	IRW; 8	PIR; 5	LVS; 8	AAS; 9	PHO; 23						8th	378	
2022	Jerry Pitts Racing	7	Toyota	PHO; 18	IRW; 7	KCR; 9	PIR; 5	SON; 19	IRW; 18	EVG; 9	PIR; 5	AAS; 18	LVS; 21	PHO; 15				6th	490	
2023	Jerry Pitts Racing	7	Toyota	PHO; 19	IRW; 7	KCR; 11	PIR; 8	SON; 24	IRW; 10	SHA; 11	EVG; 12	AAS; 10	LVS; 19	MAD; 15	PHO; 16			9th	516	
2024	Jerry Pitts Racing	7	Toyota	PHO; 23	KER; 15	PIR; 10	SON; 13	IRW; 9	IRW; 13	SHA; 9	TRI; 11	MAD; 7	AAS; 12	KER; 15	PHO; 19			7th	522	
2026	Fast Track Racing	12	Toyota	KER	PHO; 23	TUC	SHA	CNS	TRI	SON	PIR	AAS	MAD	LVS	PHO	KER		80th	21	

^{*} Season still in progress
