= 2018 NASCAR K&N Pro Series West =

65th season of NASCAR's K&N Pro Series West

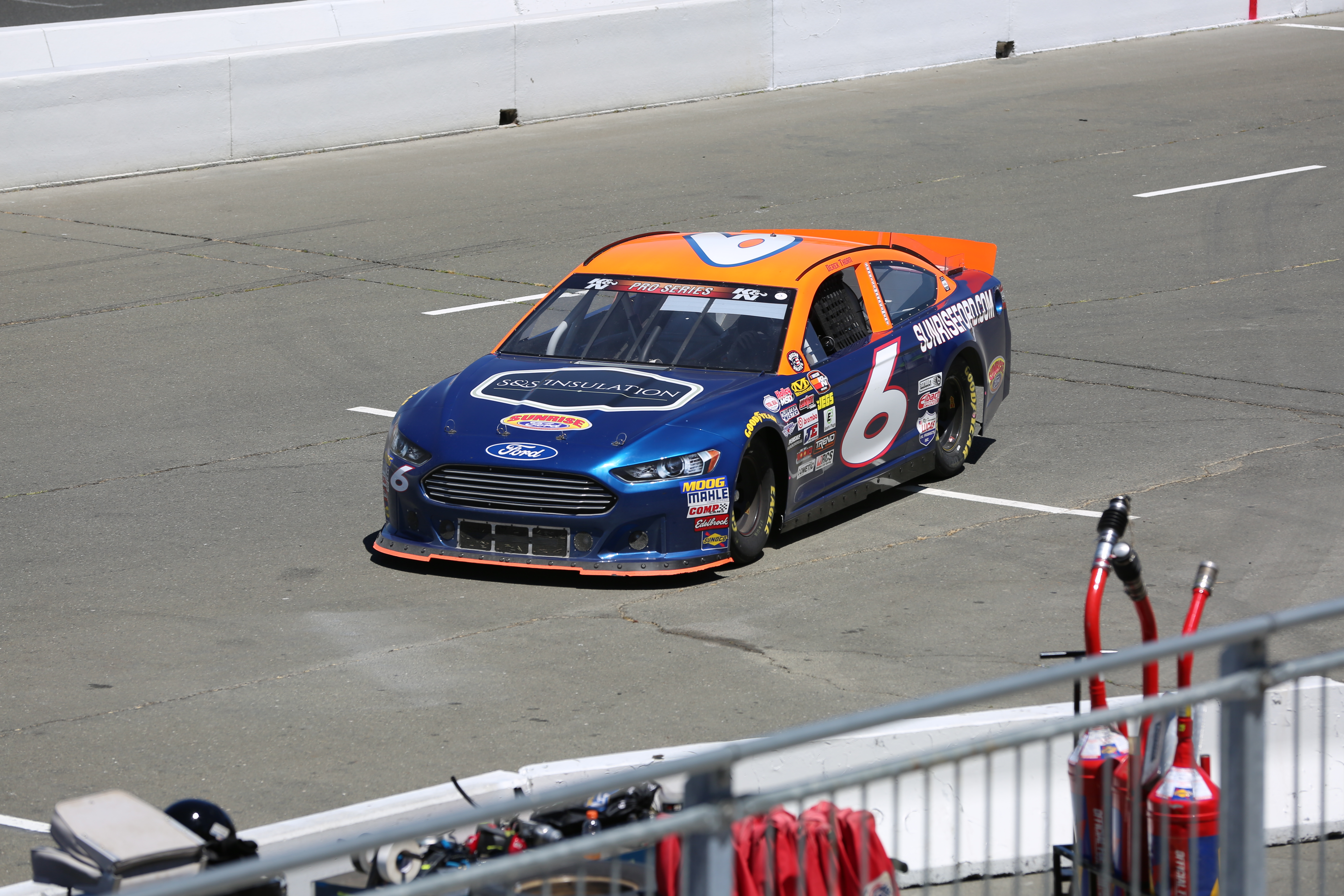
Derek Thorn, driving the No. 6 car for Sunrise Ford Racing, the 2018 K&N Pro Series West champion. This was his second title in the series.

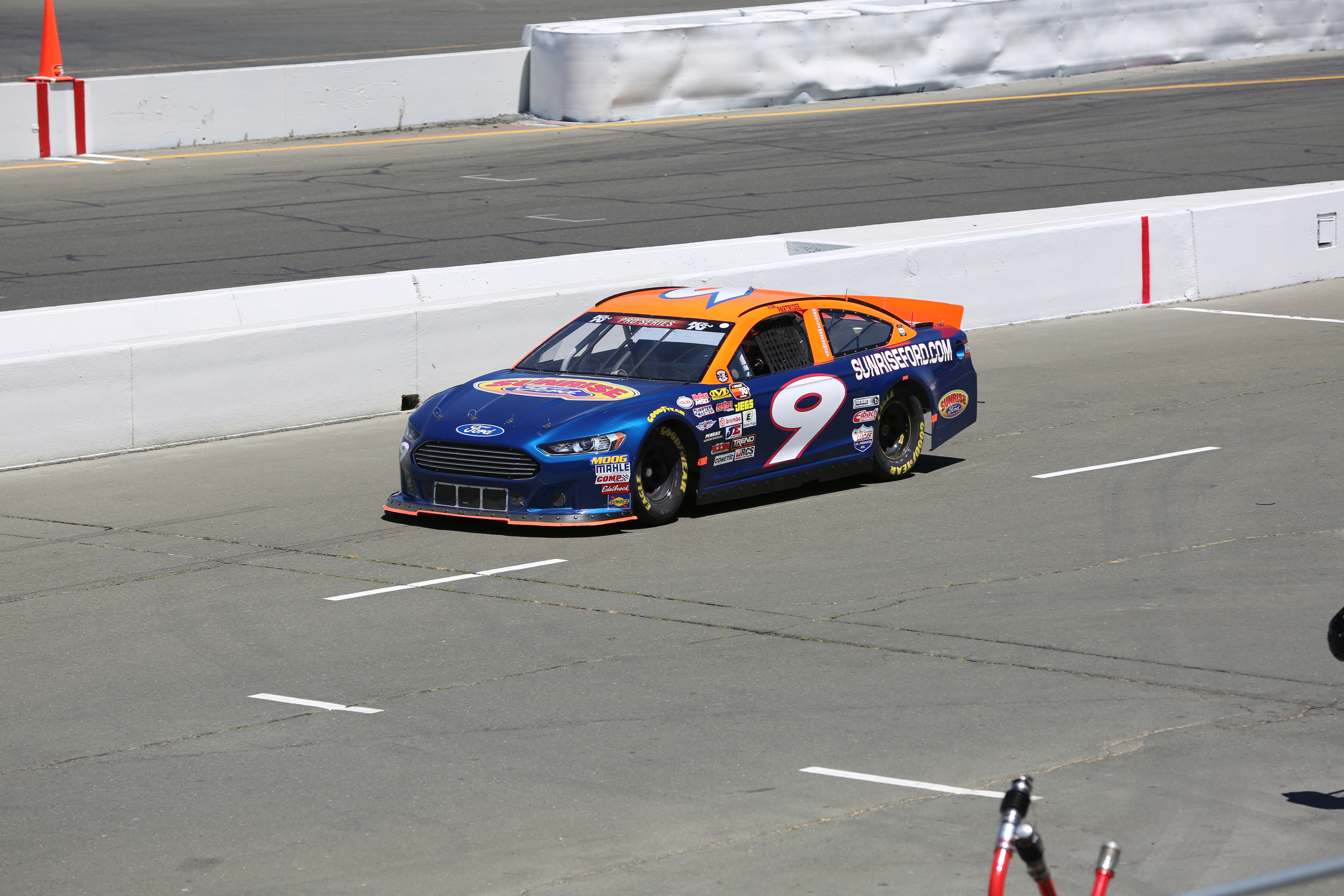
Ryan Partridge, driving the No. 9 car for Sunrise Ford Racing, finished second behind his teammate Thorn in the championship by 27 points.

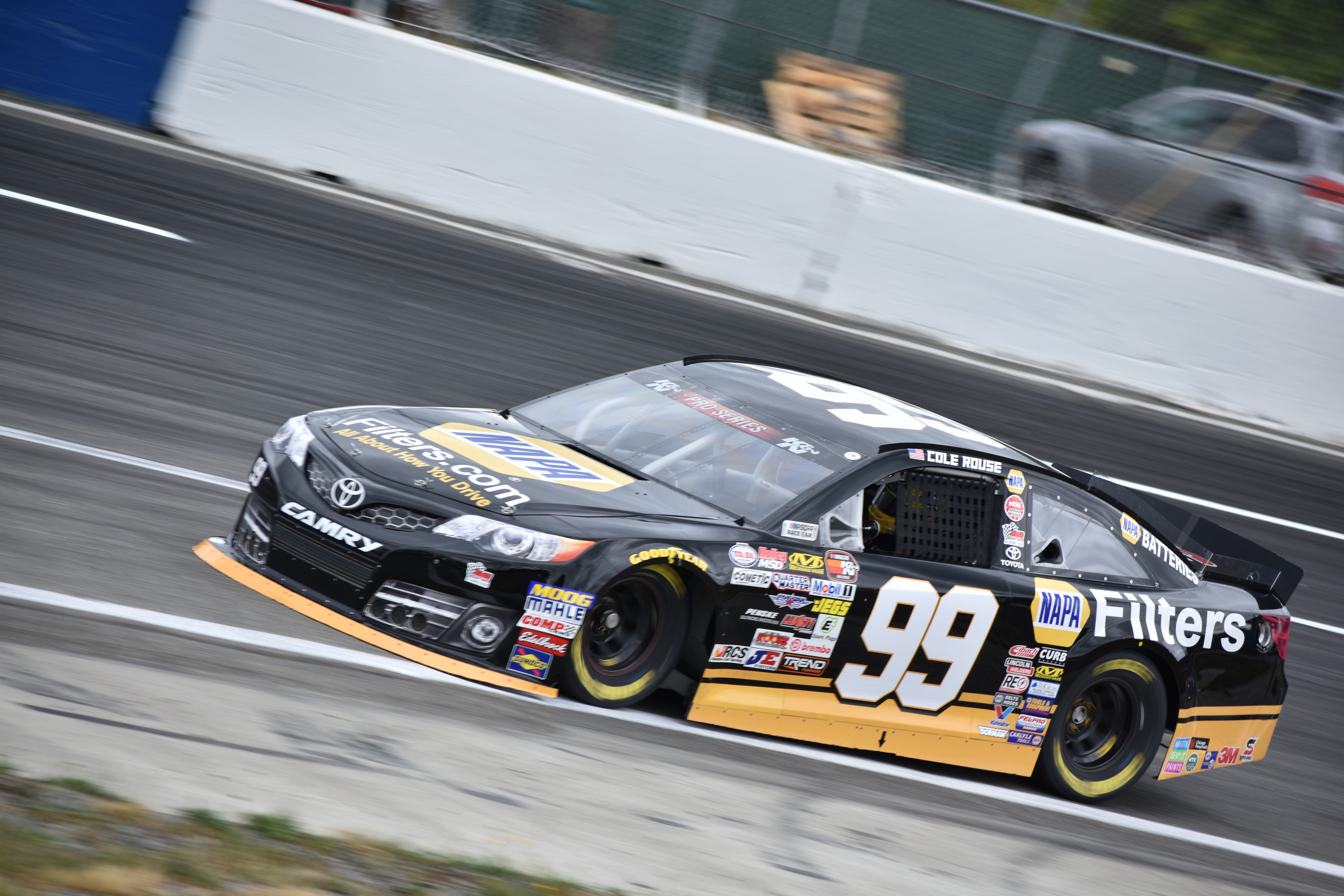
Cole Rouse, driving the No. 99 car for Bill McAnally Racing, finished third in the championship.

The 2018 NASCAR K&N Pro Series West was the sixty-fifth season of the K&N Pro Series West, a regional stock car racing series sanctioned by NASCAR. It began with the Bakersfield 175 presented by NAPA Auto Parts at Kern County Raceway Park on March 15 and concluded with the NAPA Auto Parts 175 presented by West Coast Stock Car Hall of Fame, also at Kern County Raceway Park on October 27. Todd Gilliland entered the season as the defending drivers' champion, however, he did not go for three in a row, as he moved up to the Truck Series in 2018. Derek Thorn, the 2013 West Series champion, won his second championship in his first full season since his first title, 27 points in front of his Sunrise Ford Racing teammate Ryan Partridge, who also returned to the series in 2018 after a year off in 2017.

== Drivers ==
=== Complete schedule ===
Manufacturer	Team	No.	Driver	Crew chief
Ford	Sunrise Ford Racing	6	Derek Thorn	Bill Sedgwick
Ford	Sunrise Ford Racing	9	Ryan Partridge	Jeff Schrader
Ford	Sunrise Ford Racing	22	Trevor Huddleston (R)	Clinton Cram
Toyota	Bill McAnally Racing	16	Derek Kraus	John Camilleri
Toyota	Bill McAnally Racing	19	Hailie Deegan	Joe Draper 3 Ty Joiner 5 Kevin Reed Jr.6
Toyota	Bill McAnally Racing	99	Cole Rouse	Bryan Tasnady 1 Ty Joiner 2 Chris Nelle 4 Rob Dixon 6 Ron Otto 1
Chevrolet 13 Toyota 1	John Krebs Racing	11	Takuma Koga	John Krebs 5 Hiroki Miyaji 9
Chevrolet 13 Ford 1	Levin Racing	10	Matt Levin 13	Roger Bracken 3 Ron Norman 5 Erik Higley 4 Chase Newell 1 Jerry Pitts 1
Chevrolet 13 Ford 1	Levin Racing	10	Will Rodgers (R) 1 (Note: Will Rodgers was scored as a Rookie in the Monaco Gateway Classic at Gateway.)	Roger Bracken 3 Ron Norman 5 Erik Higley 4 Chase Newell 1 Jerry Pitts 1
Ford 13 Toyota 1	Patriot Motorsports Group	43	Kody Vanderwal	Jason Dickenson

=== Limited schedule ===
Manufacturer	Team	No.	Driver	Crew chief	Rounds
Chevrolet	B&B Motorsports	8	Billy Kann	Steve Elder	1
Chevrolet	B&B Motorsports	13	Bill Kann	Billy Kann	1
Chevrolet	B&B Motorsports	18	Bill Kann	Billy Kann 5 Johnny White 2 Kevin Loster 1	8
Chevrolet	Bill McAnally Racing	24	Alex Bowman	Ron Otto	1
Chevrolet	DeLong Racing	64	David Hibbard (R)	James Swan 1 Colin Baker 1	2
Chevrolet	DeLong Racing	84	Rich DeLong III	Rich DeLong 1 Chris Dittes 4 Rich DeLong Jr. 1	6
Chevrolet	Kart Idaho Racing	08	Travis Milburn	Mike Holleran 5 Charles Price 1 Bob Wood 1 Roger Bracken 2	5
Chevrolet	Kart Idaho Racing	08	Cassie Gannis	Mike Holleran 5 Charles Price 1 Bob Wood 1 Roger Bracken 2	2
Chevrolet	Kart Idaho Racing	08	Zack St. Onge (R)	Mike Holleran 5 Charles Price 1 Bob Wood 1 Roger Bracken 2	1
Chevrolet	Kart Idaho Racing	08	John Wood	Mike Holleran 5 Charles Price 1 Bob Wood 1 Roger Bracken 2	1
Chevrolet	Kart Idaho Racing	83	Buddy Kofoid	Mike Kofoid	1
Chevrolet	McGowan Motorsports	17	David Mayhew	Johnny White 1 Bruce Cook 1 Matt Bucher 1	3
Chevrolet	Naake-Klauer Motorsports	25	Tom Klauer	Mike Naake	1
Chevrolet	Norman Levin Racing	21	Jesse Iwuji	Chase Newell	1
Chevrolet	Norman Levin Racing	40	Ron Norman	Erik Higley 4 Chris Wood 1	5
Chevrolet	Norman Levin Racing	40	Jesse Iwuji	Chase Newell	1
Chevrolet	Norman Levin Racing	40	Sheldon Creed	Jeff Stankiewicz	1
Chevrolet	Patriot Motorsports Group	91	Kyle Tellstrom (R)	Lee Hackney	1
Chevrolet	Roadrunner Motorsports	1	Jim Inglebright	Rodney Haygood	1
Chevrolet	Rodd Racing	68	Rodd Kneeland	Tim Barber	1
Chevrolet	Spurgeon Motorsports	86	Tim Spurgeon	Hollis Thackeray	1
Ford	REF Motorsports	4	Will Rodgers	Mark Perry 2 Bob Farmer 3	5
Ford	REF Motorsports	44	Rod Johnson Jr. (R)	Mark Perry	1
Ford	Jefferson Pitts Racing	4	Kevin Harvick	Richard Boswell	1
Ford	Jefferson Pitts Racing	7	Will Rodgers	Jeff Jefferson 4 Jerry Pitts 3	2
Ford	Jefferson Pitts Racing	7	Devin Dodson (R)	Jeff Jefferson 4 Jerry Pitts 3	3
Ford	Jefferson Pitts Racing	7	Cole Keatts (R)	Jeff Jefferson 4 Jerry Pitts 3	2
Ford	Jefferson Pitts Racing	51	Carlos Vieira	Charlie Wilson	1
Ford	Jefferson Pitts Racing	55	Vanessa Robinson (R)	Jeff Jefferson 1 Charlie Wilson 1	2
Ford	Jefferson Pitts Racing	55	Cole Keatts (R)	Jason Jefferson	1
Ford	Jefferson Pitts Racing	59	Reid Lanpher (R)	Jerry Pitts	1
Ford	Jefferson Pitts Racing	77	Austin Herzog	Charlie Wilson	1
Ford	Patriot Motorsports Group	34	Rudy Vanderwal (R)	Bruce Yackey 1 Don Joiner 2 Al Neep 1	3
Ford	Patriot Motorsports Group	34	Armani Williams (R)	Bruce Yackey 1 Don Joiner 2 Al Neep 1	1
Ford	Patriot Motorsports Group	34	Tim Ward (R)	James Wahl	1
Ford	Stewart–Haas Racing	41	Aric Almirola	Richard Boswell	1
Toyota	Austin Reed Racing	44	Austin Reed (R)	Bond Suss	1
Toyota	Bill McAnally Racing	04	Hershel McGriff	Jeff Barkshire	2
Toyota	Bill McAnally Racing	50	Chris Eggleston	Bryan Tasnady	1
Toyota	Bill McAnally Racing	60	Christopher Bell	Ron Otto	1
Toyota	Bill McAnally Racing	62	Brendan Gaughan	Shane Wilson	1
Toyota	Central Coast Racing	13	Todd Souza	Michael Muñoz	10
Toyota	DGR-Crosley	20	Erik Jones	Chris Lawson	1
Toyota	DGR-Crosley	54	Daniel Suárez	Seth Smith	1
Toyota	Ivie Racing	47	Scott Ivie	Unknown	1
Toyota	Kart Idaho Racing	38	Hollis Thackeray (R)	Quintin Crye 1 Roger Bracken 1	2
Toyota	Obaika Racing	97	Arnout Kok	Unknown	1
Toyota	Patriot Motorsports Group	39	Andrew Tuttle (R)	Sue McCarty	1
Toyota	Patriot Motorsports Group	39	Taylor Canfield (R)	Stafford Smith	1
Toyota	Patriot Motorsports Group	39	Keith McGee (R)	Justin Creech	1
Toyota	Performance P–1 Motorsports	77	Nick Joanides	Roger Bracken 4 Tony Jackson 1 Joe Nava 2	4
Toyota	Performance P–1 Motorsports	77	Ken Pedersen	Roger Bracken 4 Tony Jackson 1 Joe Nava 2	1
Toyota	Performance P–1 Motorsports	77	Andrew Koens (R)	Roger Bracken 4 Tony Jackson 1 Joe Nava 2	2
Ford 9 Chevrolet 1	Jefferson Pitts Racing	27	Vanessa Robinson (R)	Jeff Jefferson	2
Ford 9 Chevrolet 1	Jefferson Pitts Racing	27	Devin Dodson (R)	Jerry Pitts	1
Ford 9 Chevrolet 1	Jefferson Pitts Racing	27	William Byron	Jerry Pitts	1
Ford 9 Chevrolet 1	Jefferson Pitts Racing	27	Jeff Jefferson	Jerry Pitts	2
Ford 9 Chevrolet 1	Jefferson Pitts Racing	27	Sam Mayer (R)	Jerry Pitts	1
Ford 9 Chevrolet 1	Jefferson Pitts Racing	27	Tyler Tanner (R)	Jerry Pitts	1
Ford 9 Chevrolet 1	Jefferson Pitts Racing	27	Buddy Shepherd (R)	Jerry Pitts	1
Ford 1 Toyota 1	Patriot Motorsports Group	32	Salvatore Iovino	Kevin McCarty	1
Ford 1 Toyota 1	Patriot Motorsports Group	32	Taylor Canfield (R)	Stafford Smith	1
Chevrolet 6 Ford 4 Toyota 2	Patriot Motorsports Group	36	Jesse Iwuji	Terry Elmore 1 John Wood 4 Sonny Wahl 1 Charlie Wahl 1 Stafford Smith 1	4
Chevrolet 6 Ford 4 Toyota 2	Patriot Motorsports Group	36	Cassie Gannis	Terry Elmore 1 John Wood 4 Sonny Wahl 1 Charlie Wahl 1 Stafford Smith 1	1
Chevrolet 6 Ford 4 Toyota 2	Patriot Motorsports Group	36	Andrew Engberson (R)	Terry Elmore 1 John Wood 4 Sonny Wahl 1 Charlie Wahl 1 Stafford Smith 1	1
Chevrolet 6 Ford 4 Toyota 2	Patriot Motorsports Group	36	Sting Ray Robb (R)	Terry Elmore 1 John Wood 4 Sonny Wahl 1 Charlie Wahl 1 Stafford Smith 1	1
Chevrolet 6 Ford 4 Toyota 2	Patriot Motorsports Group	36	Taylor Canfield (R)	Terry Elmore 1 John Wood 4 Sonny Wahl 1 Charlie Wahl 1 Stafford Smith 1	1

== Schedule ==
On December 11, 2017, NASCAR announced the 2018 schedule. The two races at Irwindale were dropped from the schedule in favor of a second race at Tucson and a race at Gateway. The Las Vegas Motor Speedway dirt track was added to the schedule, marking the series' first race on dirt since 1979 at Ascot Park. All races in the season are televised on NBCSN on a tape delay basis.

No.	Race title	Track	Date
1	Bakersfield 175 presented by NAPA Auto Parts	Kern County Raceway Park, Bakersfield, California	March 15
2	Port of Tucson Twin 100s	Tucson Speedway, Tucson, Arizona	May 5
3	Port of Tucson Twin 100s	Tucson Speedway, Tucson, Arizona	May 5
4	Sunrise Ford 150 presented by NAPA Auto Parts	Orange Show Speedway, San Bernardino, California	May 19
5	NAPA Auto Parts 175	Colorado National Speedway, Dacono, Colorado	June 9
6	Carneros 200	Sonoma Raceway, Sonoma, California	June 23
7	Clint Newell Toyota 150 presented by NAPA Auto Parts	Douglas County Speedway, Roseburg, Oregon	June 30
8	Casey's General Store 150 (Note: The Casey's General Store 150 was held as a combined event, with competitors from the K&N Pro Series West competing along with competitors for the K&N Pro Series East. Drivers received points and statistical credit relative to the whole field in general, instead of relative to other drivers in their series. Also drivers were allowed to score points for both the East and West Series.)	Iowa Speedway, Newton, Iowa	July 27
9	NAPA 175 presented by the West Coast Stock Car Hall of Fame	Evergreen Speedway, Monroe, Washington	August 11
10	Monaco Gateway Classic (Note: The Monaco Gateway Classic was held as a combined event, with competitors from the K&N Pro Series West competing along with competitors for the K&N Pro Series East. Drivers received points and statistical credit relative to the whole field in general, instead of relative to other drivers in their series. Also drivers were allowed to score points for both the East and West Series.)	Gateway Motorsports Park, Madison, Illinois	August 24
11	Star Nursery 100	Las Vegas Motor Speedway (Dirt Course), Las Vegas, Nevada	September 13
12	NAPA Auto Parts Idaho 208	Meridian Speedway, Meridian, Idaho	September 29
13	NAPA AutoCare/Roseville Toyota 200 presented by TriCo Welding Supplies & the West Coast Stock Car Hall of Fame	All American Speedway, Roseville, California	October 13
14	NAPA Auto Parts 175 presented by West Coast Stock Car Hall of Fame	Kern County Raceway Park, Bakersfield, California	October 27

Notes

- The race at Spokane County Raceway, originally scheduled for 15 July, was cancelled and would not be replaced.

== Results and standings ==
=== Races ===
No.	Race	Pole position	Most laps led	Winning driver	Manufacturer
1	Bakersfield 175 presented by NAPA Auto Parts	Kevin Harvick	Kevin Harvick	Derek Kraus	Toyota
2	Port of Tucson Twin 100s	Derek Kraus	Kody Vanderwal	Kody Vanderwal	Ford
3	Port of Tucson Twin 100s	Derek Kraus^{1}	Ryan Partridge	Kody Vanderwal	Ford
4	Sunrise Ford 150 presented by NAPA Auto Parts	Ryan Partridge	Ryan Partridge	Ryan Partridge	Ford
5	NAPA Auto Parts 175	Derek Kraus	Derek Thorn	Derek Thorn	Ford
6	Carneros 200	Will Rodgers	Will Rodgers	Will Rodgers	Ford
7	Clint Newell Toyota 150 presented by NAPA Auto Parts	Derek Thorn	Derek Kraus	Derek Kraus	Toyota
8	Casey's General Store 150	Tyler Dippel	Tyler Dippel	Tyler Ankrum	Toyota
9	NAPA 175 presented by the West Coast Stock Car Hall of Fame	Derek Kraus	Derek Kraus	Derek Thorn	Ford
10	Monaco Gateway Classic	Spencer Davis^{2}	Derek Kraus	Derek Kraus	Toyota
11	Star Nursery 100	Hailie Deegan	Derek Kraus	Sheldon Creed	Chevrolet
12	NAPA Auto Parts Idaho 208	Derek Kraus	Derek Kraus	Hailie Deegan	Toyota
13	NAPA AutoCare/Roseville Toyota 200 presented by TriCo Welding Supplies & the West Coast Stock Car Hall of Fame	Cole Rouse	Ryan Partridge	Cole Rouse	Toyota
14	NAPA Auto Parts 175 presented by West Coast Stock Car Hall of Fame	Hailie Deegan	Derek Kraus	Derek Kraus	Toyota

Notes

- ^{1} – Starting grid was set by the fastest lap times from the first Port of Tucson Twin 100 race.
- ^{2} – The qualifying session for the Monaco Gateway Classic was cancelled due to weather. The starting line-up was decided by Practice results.

=== Drivers' championship ===
(key) Bold – Pole position awarded by time. Italics – Pole position set by final practice results or Owners' points. * – Most laps led.

Pos.	Driver	KER	TUC	TUC	ORG	CNS	SON	DCO	IOW	EVG	GTW	LVS	MER	AAS	KER	Points
1	Derek Thorn	2	2	3	2	1*	8	**5**	2	1	3	3	4	3	5	586
2	Ryan Partridge	5	3	2*	**1***	2	5	4	3	3	10	8	5	2*	2	559
3	Cole Rouse	3	7	4	3	6	12	6	8	2	2	6	2	**1**	7	557
4	Derek Kraus	1	**4**	**11**	5	**4**	10	1*	20	**9***	1*	17*	**3***	15	1*	543
5	Hailie Deegan **(R)**	7	8	8	4	5	7	2	21	7	23	**2**	1	7	**6**	514
6	Trevor Huddleston **(R)**	6	11	5	6	3	20	8	9	10	7	7	6	11	3	504
7	Kody Vanderwal	21	1*	1	7	7	17	3	19	4	16	20	9	13	8	479
8	Matt Levin	11	12	12	10	8	26	9	18	8		9	7	6	10	426
9	Takuma Koga	20	17	16	12	14	25	12	15	14	20	16	14	10	12	399
10	Todd Souza	22	10	14	8	12	19	Wth		12		18			9	272
11	Bill Kann	14	15	13	13		DNS^{1}		13		19	13			11	258
12	Will Rodgers	16	9	7	11		**1***	Wth		13	26					230
13	Rich DeLong III	18			15		16					22		9	16	168
14	Ron Norman	13	13	10				10							15	160
15	Jesse Iwuji	23	14	17	14		15		25							156
16	Travis Milburn	15					21						13	5	17	149
17	Vanessa Robinson **(R)**		5	6		10						12				143
18	Devin Dodson **(R)**		6	9		9			11							142
19	Nick Joanides				9					11				4	13	139
20	Cole Keatts **(R)**						9			6		4				113
21	David Mayhew	12					11								4	105
22	Taylor Canfield **(R)**												12	8	14	98
23	Rudy Vanderwal **(R)**					11		13						14		94
24	Cassie Gannis		16	15		15										86
25	Jeff Jefferson							7					8			73
26	Andrew Koens **(R)**							11					11			66
27	David Hibbard **(R)**											15		16		57
28	Hershel McGriff		18	DNS^{1}												52
29	Sheldon Creed											1				47
30	Aric Almirola						2									43
31	Kevin Harvick	**4***														42
32	William Byron						3									41
33	Daniel Suárez						4									41
34	Hollis Thackeray **(R)**						23					24				41
35	Tyler Tanner **(R)**									5						39
36	Brendan Gaughan											5				39
37	Erik Jones						6									38
38	Austin Herzog **(R)**	8														36
39	Rod Johnson Jr. **(R)**	9														35
40	Christopher Bell											10				35
41	Reid Lanpher **(R)**	10														34
42	Sting Ray Robb **(R)**												10			34
43	Austin Reed **(R)**											11				33
44	Chris Eggleston													12		33
45	John Wood					13										31
46	Tom Klauer						13									31
47	Rodd Kneeland						14									30
48	Tim Ward **(R)**											14				30
49	Armani Williams **(R)**									15						29
50	Kyle Tellstrom **(R)**												15			29
51	Zack St. Onge **(R)**				16											28
52	Sam Mayer **(R)**								17		11^{2}					27
53	Salvatore Iovino	17														27
54	Jim Inglebright						18									26
55	Keith McGee **(R)**														18	26
56	Andrew Tuttle **(R)**	19														25
57	Tim Spurgeon											19				25
58	Buddy Kofoid **(R)**											21				23
59	Carlos Vieira						22									22
60	Buddy Shepherd **(R)**											23				21
61	Alex Bowman						24									20
62	Andrew Engberson **(R)**										25					19
	Scott Ivie						Wth									
	Ken Pedersen						Wth									
	Arnout Kok **(R)**											Wth				
	Billy Kann														Wth	
Drivers ineligible for K&N Pro Series West points
	Tyler Ankrum **(R)**								1		6					
	Rubén García Jr.								5		4					
	Spencer Davis								4		24					
	Chase Cabre								24		5					
	Tyler Dippel								**6***		12					
	Ryan Vargas **(R)**								7		13					
	Dillon Bassett								12		8					
	Anthony Alfredo **(R)**								22		9					
	Kyle Benjamin								10							
	Ronnie Bassett Jr.								16		14					
	Tristan Van Wieringen **(R)**								14		17					
	Colin Garrett **(R)**								23		15					
	J. P. Morgan										18					
	Chuck Buchanan Jr.										21					
	Juan Manuel González **(R)**										22					
Pos.	Driver	KER	TUC	TUC	ORG	CNS	SON	DCO	IOW	EVG	GTW	LVS	MER	AAS	KER	Points

Notes

- ^{‡} – Non-championship round.
- ^{1} – Bill Kann and Hershel McGriff received championship points, despite the fact that they did not start the race.
- ^{2} – Scored points towards the K&N Pro Series East.

== See also ==
- 2018 Monster Energy NASCAR Cup Series
- 2018 NASCAR Xfinity Series
- 2018 NASCAR Camping World Truck Series
- 2018 NASCAR K&N Pro Series East
- 2018 NASCAR Whelen Modified Tour
- 2018 NASCAR Pinty's Series
- 2018 NASCAR PEAK Mexico Series
- 2018 NASCAR Whelen Euro Series
- 2018 CARS Tour
