= 2018 Star Nursery 100 =

Race details
- Race 11 of 14 in the 2018 NASCAR K&N Pro Series West season
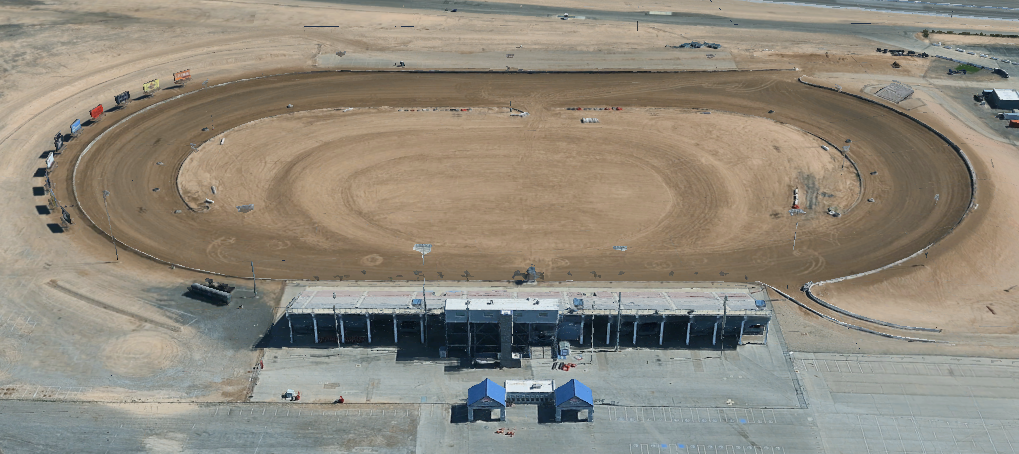
- Date: September 13, 2018
- Location: The Dirt Track at Las Vegas Motor Speedway in Las Vegas, Nevada
- Course: Permanent racing facility
- Course length: .500 miles (0.804672 km)
- Distance: 100 laps, 50 mi (80.4672 km)
- Average speed: 40.746 miles per hour (65.574 km/h)

Pole position
Driver	Hailie Deegan	Bill McAnally Racing
- Time: 21.329

Most laps led
Driver	Derek Kraus	Bill McAnally Racing
- Laps: 31

Winner
No. 40	Sheldon Creed	Norman Levin Racing

The 2018 Star Nursery 100 was a NASCAR K&N Pro Series West race held at the The Dirt Track at Las Vegas Motor Speedway in Las Vegas, Nevada. The event marked the first K&N Pro Series race on a dirt track since 1979. Sheldon Creed won the race, followed by Bill McAnally Racing's Hailie Deegan and Sunrise Ford Racing's Derek Thorn in second and third respectively.
