= Sunrise Ford Racing =

NASCAR team

- Owner: Bob Bruncati
- Base: Fontana, California
- Series: ARCA Menards Series West
- Manufacturer: Ford
- Opened: 2000

Career
- Debut: ARCA Menards Series West: 2006
- Drivers' Championships: 2009, 2013, 2018, 2022

Sunrise Ford Racing (SFR), sometimes referred to as Bob Bruncati Racing is an American professional stock car racing team that last competed full-time in the ARCA Menards Series West. It was a Sunrise Ford dealership network subsidiary based in North Hollywood and Fontana, California. The team last fielded the No. 6 Ford Fusion for Jake Drew and the No. 9 Ford for Tanner Reif in 2022.

== History ==
The team was formed by Bob Bruncati in 2000 to allow his sons to race at the Irwindale Event Center. On November 4, 2022, it was announced that SFR would shut down operations following the 2022 ARCA West season to focus on local short-track racing.

=== ARCA Menards Series West ===
SFR moved to the West Series in 2006 to stay involved in racing and promote Sunrise Ford dealerships on a broader scale. The team won four series championships throughout their time in the series. Jason Bowles won the title in 2009, Derek Thorn in 2013 and 2018, and Jake Drew in 2022. All four of Sunrise Ford's titles came with their No. 6 car. In 2020, the team formed a driver development program with Stewart-Haas Racing.

==== Car No. 6 history ====
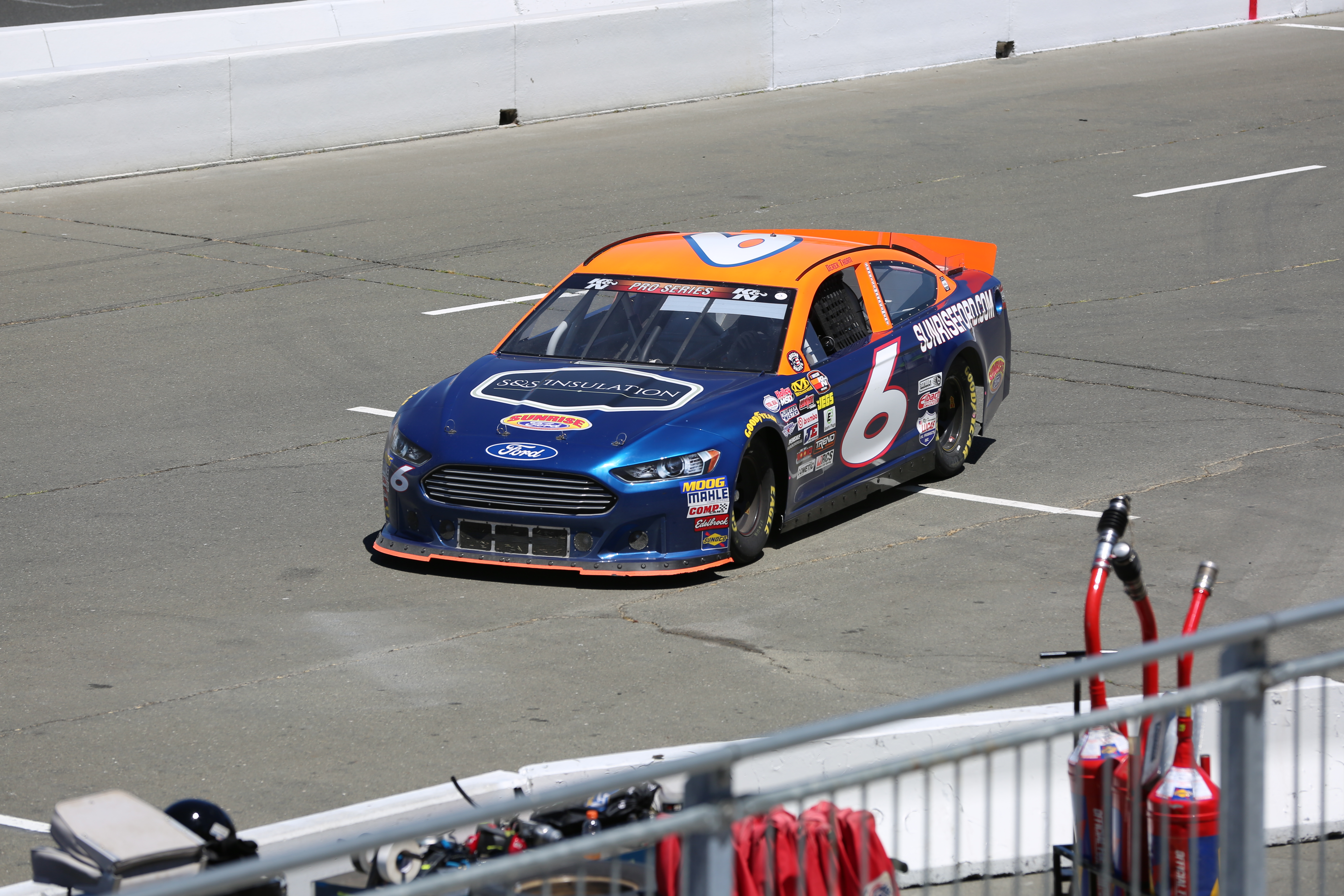
Derek Thorn drove the No. 6 car to two championships in 2013 and 2018. Here, he is seen driving at Sonoma in 2018.

Originally operating as car No. 22, Jason Bowles drove for SFR's first three full-time seasons, winning Rookie of the Year in 2007 and the series championship in 2009. Luis Martinez Jr. drove the entry in 2010, earning Rookie of the Year honors. He returned to the seat in 2011.

Derek Thorn drove Sunrise's main No. 6 in 2012 and 2013, winning the drivers' championship in his second year. James Bickford replaced Thorn for the following season winning races at Stateline Speedway in 2014 and 2015. Cole Rouse then drove the No. 6 in 2016. He was then replaced by Julia Landauer in 2017.

Thorn returned to Sunrise's No. 6 in 2018 and won Sunrise's third championship. Jagger Jones drove the No. 6 for 2019, winning one race and earning Rookie of the Year honors. Trevor Huddleston took over the No. 6 entry in 2020, and returned in 2021. In 2022, Jake Drew returned to the ride and won the championship.

==== Car No. 9 history ====
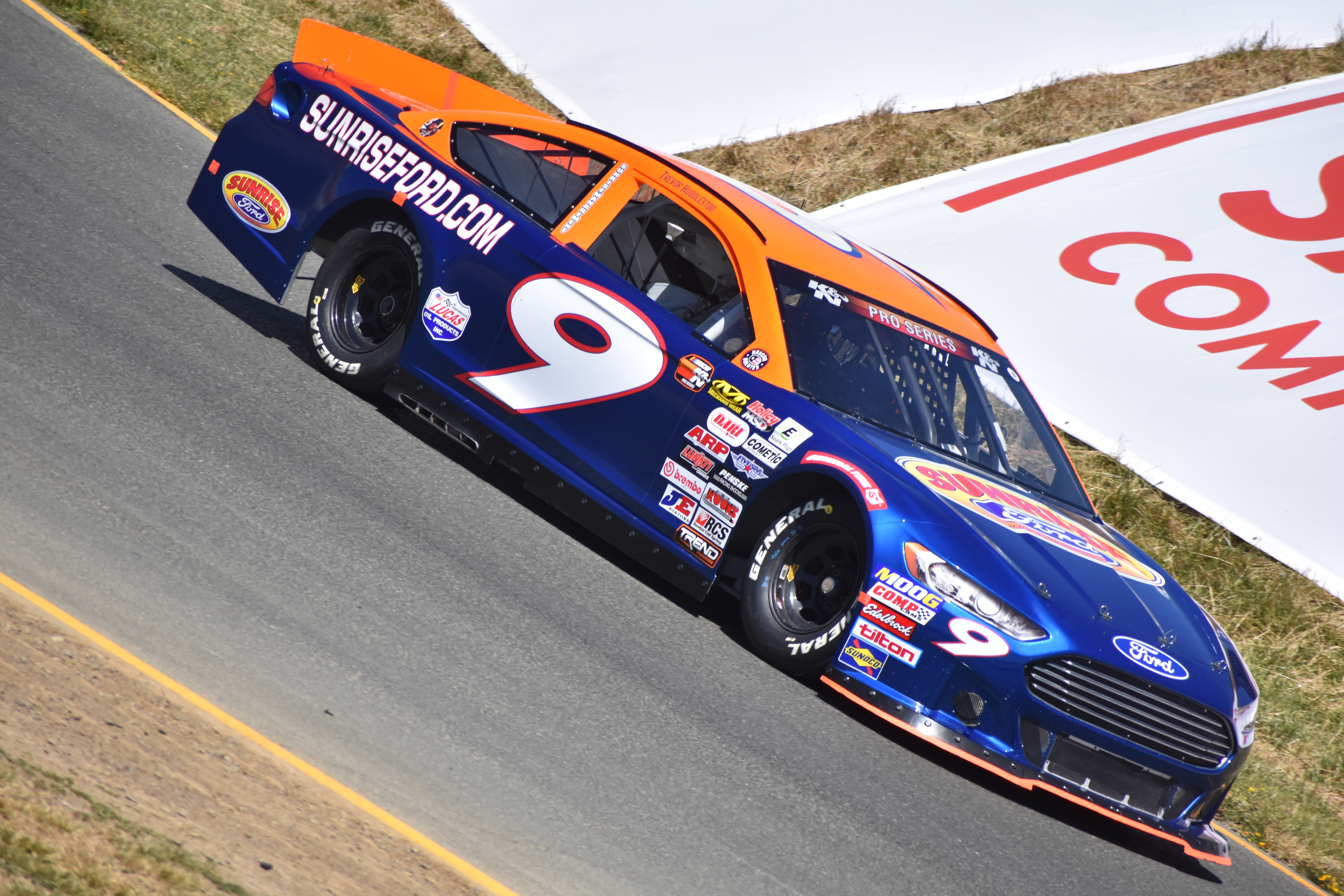
Trevor Huddleston drove the car full-time in 2019. Here, he is seen driving at Sonoma that year.

In his lone West Series season, Austin Dyne won Rookie of the Year driving the No. 9 car in 2012. Dylan Lupton drove the No. 9 for 2013 and 2014. He won two races, the first at Evergreen Speedway in 2013 and Kern County in 2014. Lupton also claimed West Series Rookie of the Year in 2013. Ryan Partridge drove the No. 9 for the next two years, notching four wins. For 2017, the No. 9 was a full-time team; Zane Smith drove the opening race, and after an offer from team owner Bob Bruncati, Michael Self drove the car in the rest of the events. Partridge, returning to the seat, finished second in the 2018 point standings behind teammate Derek Thorn. Trevor Huddleston then replaced him, driving the No. 9 for 2019. Clinton Cram served as crew chief in 2019. Blaine Perkins drove the car in 2020. Jake Drew joined the team in 2021, losing the title to Jesse Love in a tiebreaker. Tanner Reif took over the car in 2022, making Drew switch to the 6.

==== Car No. 22 history ====
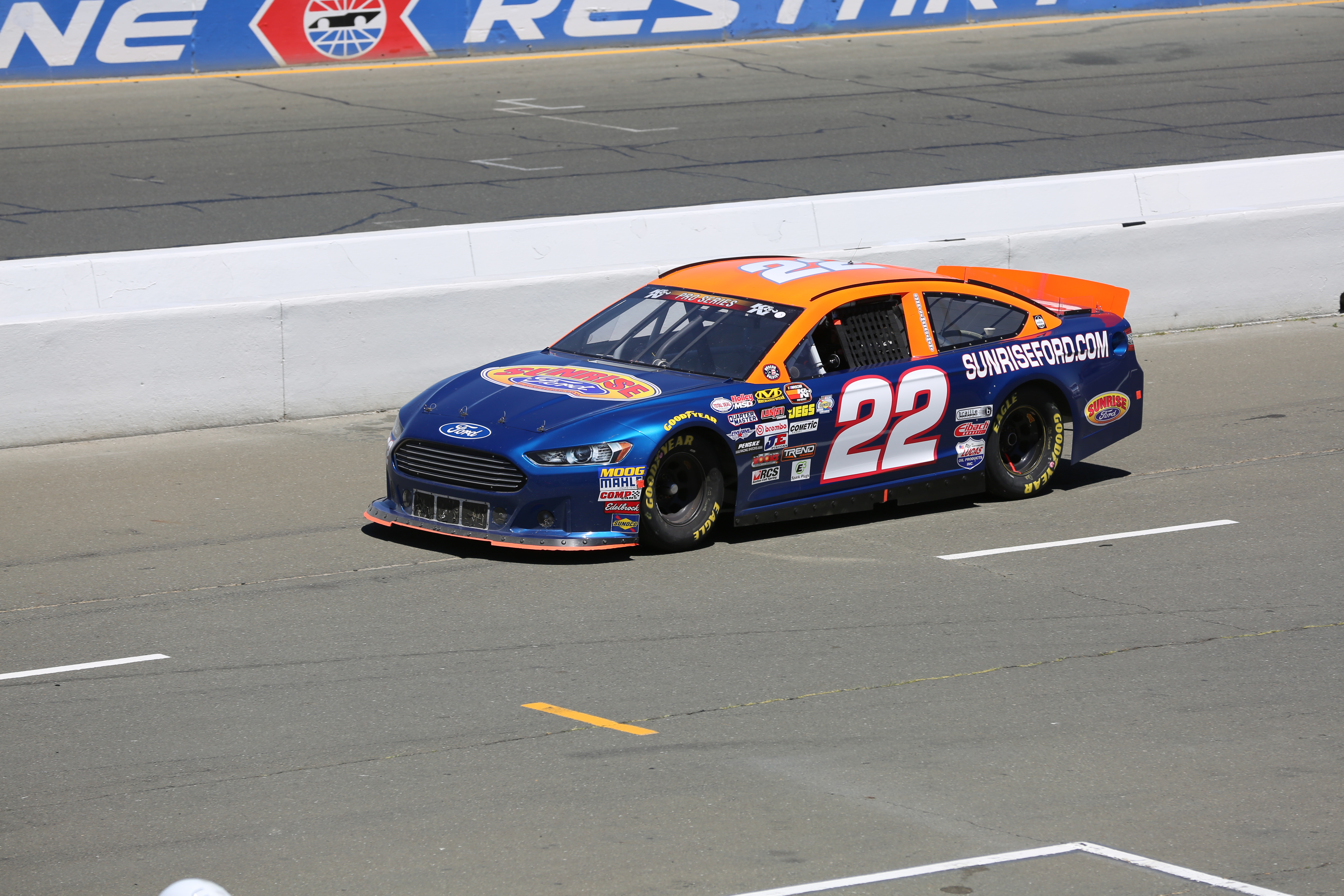
Trevor Huddleston drove the car full-time in 2018. Here, he is seen driving at Sonoma that year.

2016 was the first year the team's third entry raced. Trevor Huddleston and James Bruncati each ran one race in the car. In 2017, the car was also used as an occasional entry, this time for Thorn. For 2018, Huddleston returned to the No. 22 for an entire season.

=== After ARCA Menards Series ===
2022 was the last season for the Sunrise Ford Racing team as Bob Bruncati retired the following year. The following year he started running jr. spec late models at Irwindale Speedway which he co-owned. He still has a "racing team" consisting of teaching kids how to drive racecars with professional spotters and crews.
