= Meridian Speedway (Idaho) =

Motorsport track in Idaho, United States

The Concrete Jungle

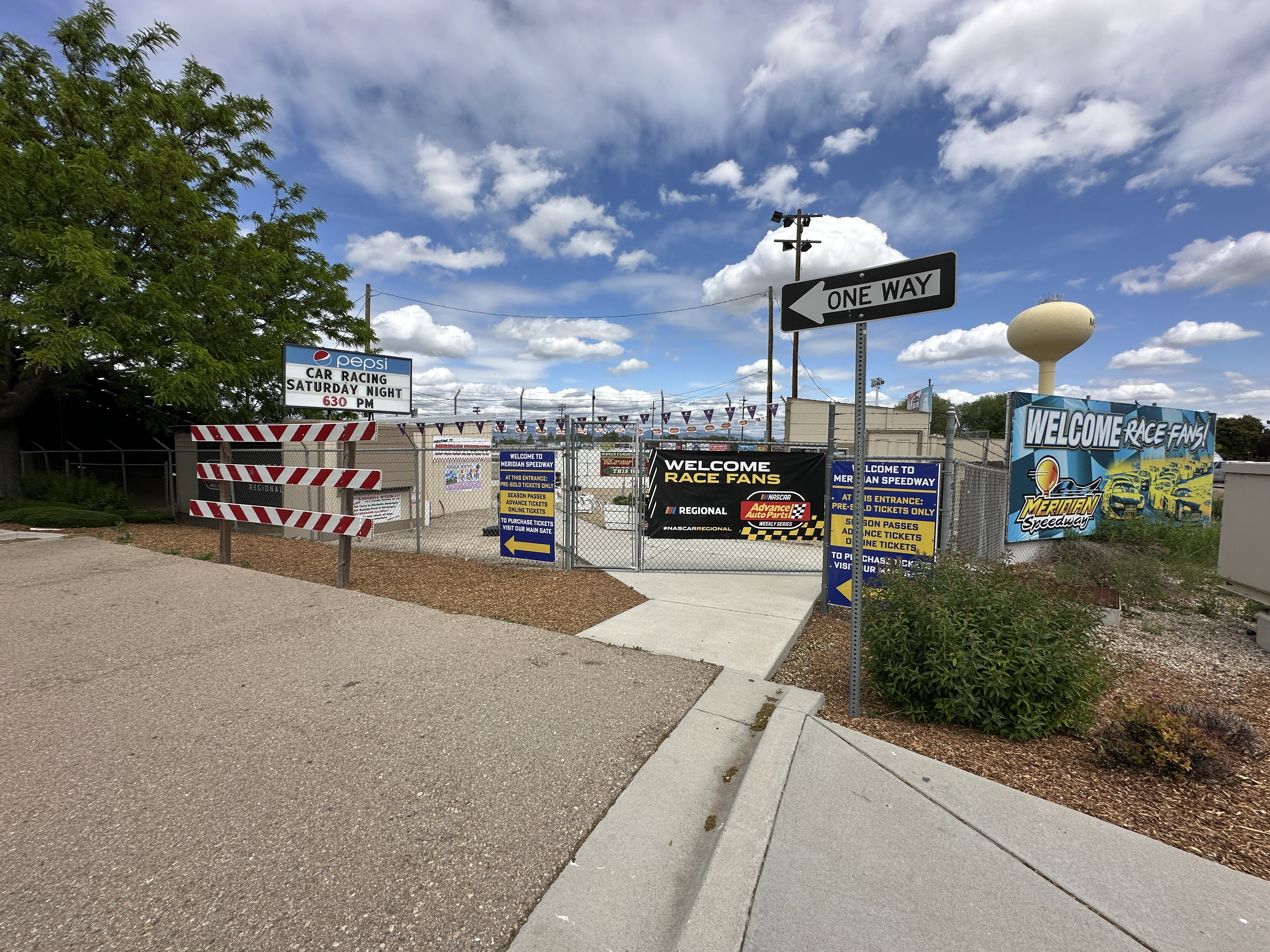
- The Meridian Speedway Presold Tickets Entrance near Main Street, with the Meridian water tower in the background
- Location: 335 South Main Street, Meridian, Idaho, 83642
- Coordinates: 43°36′07″N 116°23′26″W
- Opened: 1951
- Major events: Former: NASCAR K&N Pro Series West (1972, 2015–2019); NASCAR Northwest Series (1985–1986, 1989–1991, 2006)
- Website: https://www.meridianspeedway.com/

Oval (1951–present)
- Surface: Asphalt
- Length: 0.250 mi (0.402 km)
- Turns: 4

Meridian Speedway is a motorsport race track in Meridian, Idaho, United States. The 0.250 mi (0.402 km) in length track, which is paved with asphalt, mostly hosts late model racing, modified racing, and other local-level racing events throughout the year. The tracks holds weekly races under the NASCAR sanction as a member of the NASCAR Advance Auto Parts Weekly Series. The biggest event it has hosted is the ARCA Menards Series West (formerly the NASCAR K&N Pro Series West), which held races at the track from 2015 to 2019 as well as 1972.

Due to its small size, the infield is empty (only a patch of grass) and pit road is located outside the track behind the backstretch. The entrance to pit road is located in turn 2, with the exit back onto the track in turn 3. Right outside of the track is the town's yellow water tower, and a replica of it is on the track's winner's trophies.

The track is notable for being the track that Hailie Deegan won her first NASCAR race at to become only the second female to win a NASCAR race. She won the 2018 West Series race here.

== History ==
Meridian Speedway opened in 1951. The facilities were listed on the National Register of Historic Places in 2024.

In 2020, Meridian Speedway temporarily closed in March due to the COVID-19 pandemic. Racing resumed in May with no fans, and as a result, the track started a partnership with SpeedCast.tv to broadcast its races on a pay-per-view basis, with it ranging from $19.99 to $39.99 to watch a race. The track had broadcast select events on FloRacing in 2021; it started streaming all weekly races on the service starting in 2022.

Meridian Speedway has also hosted NASCAR-sanctioned events, including races in the NASCAR K&N Pro Series West, now known as the ARCA Menards Series West. The series competed at Meridian in 1972 and returned from 2015 to 2019. Hailie Deegan won the 2018 race at the track.

The speedway was added to the National Register of Historic Places on February 29, 2024. The listing recognizes the property for its association with the agricultural and recreational history of Meridian and Ada County. Racing continues at the speedway, which remains a quarter-mile asphalt track hosting local and regional racing events.

== Events ==
The track hosted six races of the NASCAR Northwest Series through the years.

=== Idaho 208 under NASCAR sanction ===
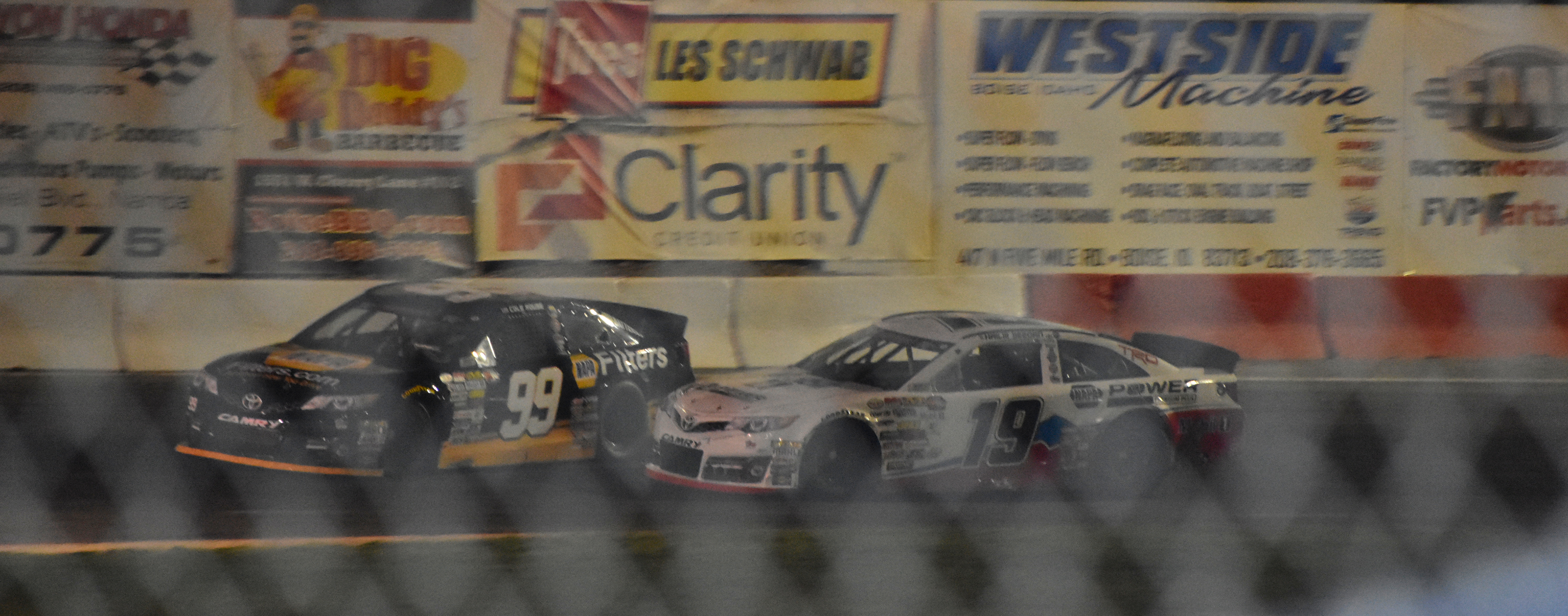
Hailie Deegan passing Cole Rouse on the last lap of the 2018 West Series race at Meridian to score her first NASCAR win

Meridian Speedway hosted the NAPA Auto Parts Idaho 208, a NASCAR K&N Pro Series West race, from 2015 to 2019. The race was also on the original schedule for the 2020 season of the rebranded ARCA Menards Series West, but due to COVID-19, was later postponed from its August 29 date and eventually cancelled and replaced with a second race for the series at the Las Vegas Motor Speedway Bullring. Meridian Speedway was permanently removed from the West Series schedule in 2021.

=== Idaho 208 under Super Late Model event ===
The track replaced the August 29 date with a Super Late Model "Idaho 208" event which was broadcast live on FloRacing and won by Californian Jeremy Doss. The event was part of the NAPA Big Late Model tour.

The 2021 event was organized again as a Super Late Model event under the Speed Tour Super Late Models sanction and was broadcast live on FloRacing. It paid $20,000 to winner Preston Peltier.
