= Braeden Havens =

American racing driver (born 1993)

- Born: August 13, 1993 (age 33); Spokane, Washington, U.S.

ARCA Menards Series West career
- 20 races run over 7 years
- Best finish: 16th (2012)
- First race: 2011 Spokane 200 (Spokane)
- Last race: 2017 Toyota / NAPA Auto Parts 150 (Spokane)
Wins	Top tens	Poles
0	8	1
- Statistics up to date as of November 25, 2024.

Braeden Havens (born August 13, 1993) is an American professional stock car racing driver who has competed in the NASCAR K&N Pro Series West from 2011 to 2017. He is the older brother of Jess Havens, who also competed in what is now known as the ARCA Menards Series West.

Havens has also previously competed in series such as the PASS Northwest Super Late Model Triple Crown Series, the ICAR Late Model Series, the Northwest Super Late Model Series, and the Inland Northwest Super Stock Association.

== Motorsports results ==
=== NASCAR ===
(key) (Bold - Pole position awarded by qualifying time. Italics - Pole position earned by points standings or practice time. * – Most laps led.)

==== K&N Pro Series West ====
NASCAR K&N Pro Series West results
Year	Team	No.	Make	1	2	3	4	5	6	7	8	9	10	11	12	13	14	15	NKNPSWC	Pts	Ref
2011	Mike Naake	88	Chevy	PHO	AAS	MMP	IOW	LVS	SON	IRW	EVG	PIR	CNS	MRP	SPO; 11				59th	209	
2011	Dick Midgley	09	Chevy													AAS; DNQ	PHO		59th	209	
2012	Thompson Motorsports	61	Chevy	PHO	LHC; 8	MMP	S99; 13	IOW	BIR	LVS; 12	SON	EVG; 11	CNS; 10	IOW	PIR	SMP; 7	AAS; 11		16th	265	
2012	Thompson Motorsports	60	Chevy															PHO; 15	16th	265	
2013	Todd Havens	82	Chevy	PHO	S99	BIR	IOW	L44	SON	CNS	IOW	EVG; 4	SRP; 9	MMP	SMP	AAS	KCR	PHO; 31	30th	88	
2014	Todd Havens	82	Chevy	PHO	IRW	S99	IOW	KCR	SON	**SLS**; 4	CNS	IOW	EVG; Wth	KCR	MMP	AAS; 14	PHO		27th	94	
2015	Todd Havens	83	Chevy	KCR	IRW	TUS	IOW	SHA	SON	SLS; 18	IOW	EVG; 15	CNS	MER	AAS; 5	PHO			23rd	94	
2016	Todd Havens	83	Chevy	IRW	KCR	TUS	OSS	CNS	SON	SLS; 16	IOW	EVG; 11	DCS	UMC	UMC	MER	AAS		32nd	61	
2017	Thompson Motorsports	61	Ford	TUS	KCR	IRW	IRW	SPO; 9	OSS	CNS	SON	IOW	EVG	DCS	MER	AAS	KCR		46th	35	
