= John Wood (racing driver, born 1962) =

American racing driver (born 1962)

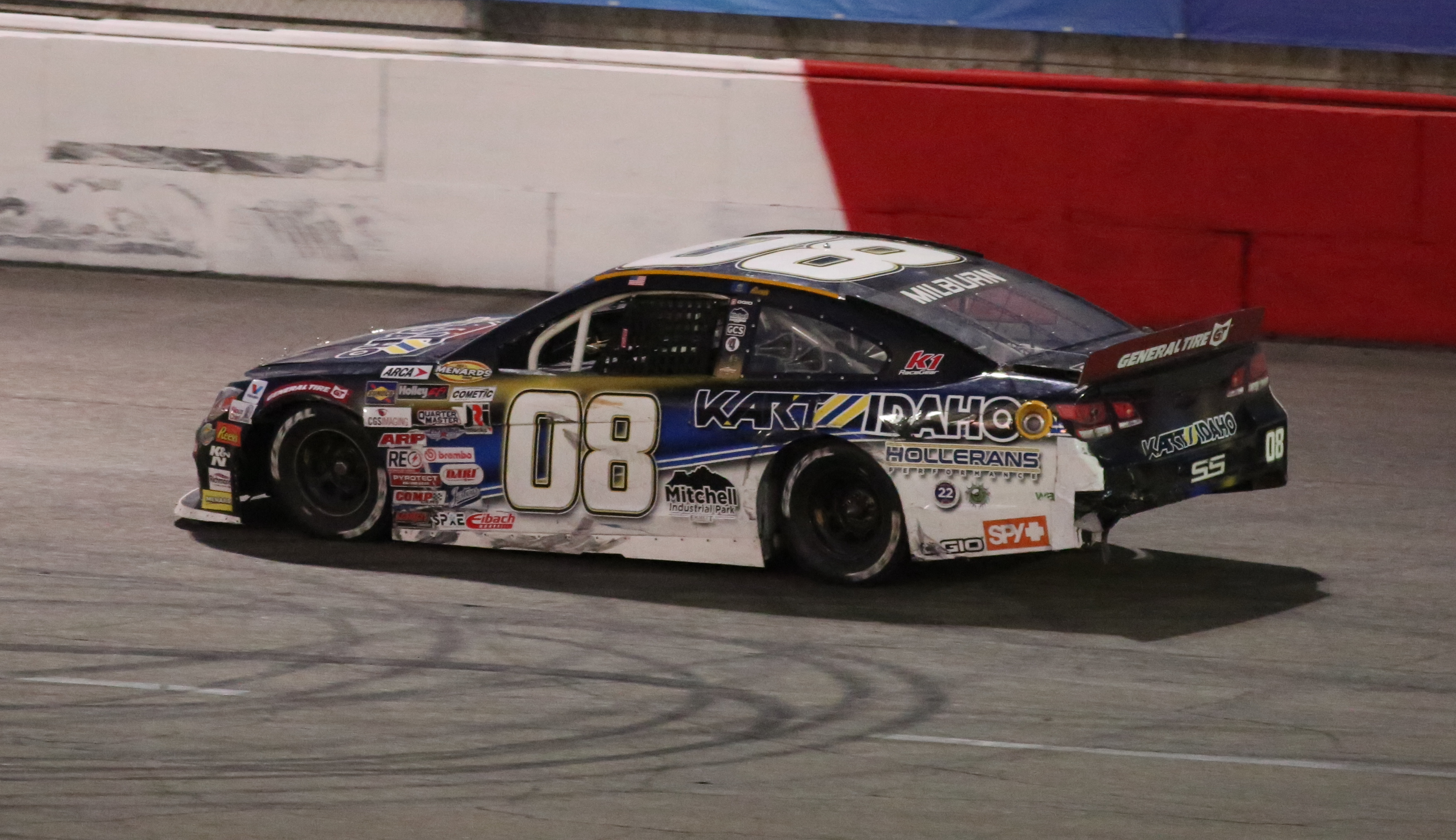
- Wood's No. 08 car at All American Speedway in 2021
- Born: March 15, 1962 (age 64); Eagle, Idaho, U.S.

ARCA Menards Series East career
- 7 races run over 4 years
- Best finish: 23rd (2017)
- First race: 2017 Stars & Stripes 150 (Berlin)
- Last race: 2019 Monaco Cocktails Gateway Classic 125 (Gateway)
| Wins | Top tens | Poles |
|---|---|---|
| 0 | 0 | 0 |

ARCA Menards Series West career
- 88 races run over 11 years
- Best finish: 7th (2014)
- First race: 1997 CARQUEST Auto Parts 200 (Mesa Marin)
- Last race: 2021 NAPA Auto Care 150 (Roseville)
| Wins | Top tens | Poles |
|---|---|---|
| 0 | 7 | 0 |
- Statistics up to date as of April 23, 2023.

John Wood (born March 15, 1962) is an American professional stock car racing driver who has previously competed in the NASCAR K&N Pro Series East and ARCA Menards Series West.

Wood made his debut in the then NASCAR Winston West Series in 1997 at Mesa Marin Speedway, where he finished sixteenth due to rear end issues. He wouldn't make another start in the series until 2011, where he ran a partial schedule with Mike Naake and Mike Holleran. He then ran in the series for the next seven year, primarily driving for Holleran, where he achieved six top-ten finishes with a best points finish of seventh at 2014, and a best race finish of sixth at Colorado National Speedway in 2019. He also made seven starts in the NASCAR K&N Pro Series East from 2017 to 2019, getting a best finish of fourteenth in his series debut at Berlin Raceway in 2017.

After not racing the previous year, Wood returned to the now ARCA Menards Series West, driving in four races with Kart Idaho Racing, finishing twelfth at Colorado, fifteenth at Irwindale Speedway, nineteenth at the Las Vegas Motor Speedway Bullring, and nineteenth again at All American Speedway. He has not competed in the series since then.

== Motorsports results ==
=== NASCAR ===
(key) (Bold – Pole position awarded by qualifying time. Italics – Pole position earned by points standings or practice time. * – Most laps led.)

==== K&N Pro Series East ====
NASCAR K&N Pro Series East results
| Year | Team | No. | Make | 1 | 2 | 3 | 4 | 5 | 6 | 7 | 8 | 9 | 10 | 11 | 12 | 13 | 14 | NKNPSEC | Pts | Ref |
|---|---|---|---|---|---|---|---|---|---|---|---|---|---|---|---|---|---|---|---|---|
| 2012 | Randy Keckley | 36 | Ford | BRI | GRE | RCH | IOW; DNQ | BGS | JFC | LGY | CNB | COL | | | | | | N/A | 0 | |
| 2012 | Randy Keckley | 36 | Dodge | | | | | | | | | | IOW; DNQ | NHA | DOV | GRE | CAR | N/A | 0 | |
| 2017 | Patriots Motorsports Group | 38 | Chevy | NSM | GRE | BRI | SBO | SBO | MEM | BLN; 14 | TMP; 18 | NHA; 19 | IOW | GLN | LGY | NJM | DOV | 23rd | 93 | |
| 2018 | Kart Idaho Racing | 08 | Chevy | NSM; 27 | BRI | LGY; Wth | SBO | SBO | MEM | NJM | THO | NHA | IOW | GLN | GTW | NHA | DOV | 60th | 17 | |
| 2019 | Kart Idaho Racing | 38 | Ford | NSM | BRI | SBO | SBO; 15 | MEM | NHA | IOW | | | | | | | | 29th | 56 | |
| 2019 | Kart Idaho Racing | 38 | Toyota | | | | | | | | GLN; 15 | BRI | | | | | | 29th | 56 | |
| 2019 | Kart Idaho Racing | 38 | Chevy | | | | | | | | | | GTW; 17 | NHA | DOV | | | 29th | 56 | |

=== ARCA Menards Series West ===
ARCA Menards Series West results
| Year | Team | No. | Make | 1 | 2 | 3 | 4 | 5 | 6 | 7 | 8 | 9 | 10 | 11 | 12 | 13 | 14 | 15 | AMSWC | Pts | Ref |
|---|---|---|---|---|---|---|---|---|---|---|---|---|---|---|---|---|---|---|---|---|---|
| 1997 | N/A | 14 | Ford | TUS | AMP | SON | TUS | MMR; 16 | LVS | CAL | EVG | POR | PPR | AMP | SON | MMR | LVS | | 64th | 115 | |
| 2011 | Mike Naake | 88 | Chevy | PHO | AAS | MMP | IOW | LVS | SON | IRW; 24 | EVG; 15 | PIR | CNS; 15 | MRP; 14 | | | | | 19th | 760 | |
| 2011 | Mike Holleran | 36 | Chevy | | | | | | | | | | | | SPO; 14 | | | | 19th | 760 | |
| 2011 | Mike Holleran | 38 | Toyota | | | | | | | | | | | | | AAS; 23 | PHO; 22 | | 19th | 760 | |
| 2012 | Randy Keckley | 36 | Ford | PHO; 26 | LHC; 18 | MMP; 13 | S99; 18 | IOW; DNQ | | LVS; 22 | | | | | | | | | 13th | 378 | |
| 2012 | Randy Keckley | 36 | Dodge | | | | | | BIR; 15 | | SON; 22 | | CNS; 14 | IOW; DNQ | PIR; 19 | SMP; 13 | AAS; 18 | | 13th | 378 | |
| 2012 | Bob Wood | 14 | Toyota | | | | | | | | | EVG; 22 | | | | | | | 13th | 378 | |
| 2012 | Marv Brown | 30 | Toyota | | | | | | | | | | | | | | | PHO; 26 | 13th | 378 | |
| 2013 | Marv Brown | 30 | Toyota | PHO; 18 | | | | | | | | | | | | | | | 10th | 423 | |
| 2013 | Adan Alvardo | 30 | Toyota | | S99; 12 | BIR; 14 | IOW; 12 | L44; 14 | | CNS; 18 | | EVG; 18 | SPO; 13 | | SMP; 10 | | | | 10th | 423 | |
| 2013 | Kart Idaho Racing | 38 | Ford | | | | | | SON; 19 | | | | | | | | | | 10th | 423 | |
| 2013 | Bob Wood | 14 | Toyota | | | | | | | | IOW; 10 | | | | | AAS; 21 | KCR; 24 | PHO; 22 | 10th | 423 | |
| 2013 | Adan Alvardo | 30 | Dodge | | | | | | | | | | | MMP; 12 | | | | | 10th | 423 | |
| 2014 | Nicklaus Sommer | 30 | Toyota | PHO; 18 | IRW; 16 | S99; 11 | | | | SLS; 13 | CNS; 9 | IOW; 11 | EVG; 15 | KCR; 12 | | AAS; 12 | PHO; 25 | | 7th | 412 | |
| 2014 | Kevin McCarty | 36 | Toyota | | | | IOW; 12 | | | | | | | | | | | | 7th | 412 | |
| 2014 | Bob Wood | 14 | Toyota | | | | | KCR; 12 | | | | | | | | | | | 7th | 412 | |
| 2014 | Adan Alvardo | 30 | Dodge | | | | | | SON; 18 | | | | | | MMP; 15 | | | | 7th | 412 | |
| 2015 | Kevin McCarty | 36 | Toyota | KCR; 22 | IRW; 18 | TUS; 17 | | | | | | | | | | | | | 15th | 226 | |
| 2015 | Jefferson Pitts Racing | 55 | Toyota | | | | IOW; 14 | | | | IOW; 14 | EVG | CNS | | | | | | 15th | 226 | |
| 2015 | Kirby Parke | 06 | Toyota | | | | | SHA; 21 | SON; 26 | SLS; 16 | | | | | | | | | 15th | 226 | |
| 2015 | Spurgeon Motorsports | 86 | Toyota | | | | | | | | | | | MER; 22 | AAS | PHO | | | 15th | 226 | |
| 2016 | Hanson Racing | 06 | Chevy | IRW; 16 | KCR; 13 | TUS; 13 | | | | | | | | | | | | | 15th | 240 | |
| 2016 | Hanson Racing | 06 | Toyota | | | | OSS; 11 | CNS; 15 | SON | | | | | | | MER; 17 | AAS; 15 | | 15th | 240 | |
| 2016 | Kevin McCarty | 08 | Toyota | | | | | | | SLS; 12 | IOW | EVG | DCS | MMP | MMP | | | | 15th | 240 | |
| 2017 | Patriots Motorsports Group | 38 | Chevy | TUS | KCR | IRW | IRW | SPO | OSS; 10 | CNS; 18 | | IOW; 32 | EVG; 15 | DCS; 20 | MER; 15 | AAS; 20 | KCR | | 18th | 193 | |
| 2017 | Patriots Motorsports Group | 14 | Ford | | | | | | | | SON; 29 | | | | | | | | 18th | 193 | |
| 2018 | Patriots Motorsports Group | 08 | Chevy | KCR | TUS | TUS | OSS | CNS; 13 | SON | DCS | IOW | EVG | GTW | LVS | MER | AAS | KCR | | 45th | 31 | |
| 2019 | Kart Idaho Racing | 38 | Chevy | LVS | IRW; QL† | TUS; 10 | | CNS; 6 | | | | EVG; 11 | GTW; 17 | | AAS; 14 | KCR | PHO | | 10th | 262 | |
| 2019 | Kart Idaho Racing | 36 | Chevy | | | | TUS; 17 | | | | | | | | | | | | 10th | 262 | |
| 2019 | Kart Idaho Racing | 38 | Toyota | | | | | | SON; 32 | DCS; 9 | IOW | | | | | | | | 10th | 262 | |
| 2019 | Kart Idaho Racing | 38 | Ford | | | | | | | | | | | MER; 18 | | | | | 10th | 262 | |
| 2021 | Kart Idaho Racing | 08 | Chevy | PHO | SON | IRW | CNS; 12 | IRW; 15 | PIR | LVS; 19 | AAS; 19 | PHO | | | | | | | 16th | 111 | |
