= Justin Funkhouser =

American racing driver (born 1983)

- Born: October 6, 1983 (age 43); Paradise, California, U.S.

ARCA Menards Series West career
- 34 races run over 6 years
- Best finish: 12th (2011)
- First race: 2010 Toyota / NAPA Auto Parts Bonus Challenge (Roseville)
- Last race: 2017 NAPA Auto Parts 150 (Bakersfield)
Wins	Top tens	Poles
0	4	0
- Statistics up to date as of November 25, 2024.

Justin Funkhouser (born October 6, 1983) is an American professional stock car racing driver who has competed in the NASCAR K&N Pro Series East and the NASCAR K&N Pro Series West.

Funkhouser has also competed in the West Coast Sportsman Series, the Speed Tour Super Modifieds Series, and the Joe Hunt Magnetos Sprint Car Series.

== Motorsports results ==
=== NASCAR ===
(key) (Bold - Pole position awarded by qualifying time. Italics - Pole position earned by points standings or practice time. * – Most laps led.)

==== K&N Pro Series East ====
NASCAR K&N Pro Series East results
Year	Team	No.	Make	1	2	3	4	5	6	7	8	9	10	11	12	NKNPSEC	Pts	Ref
2011	Art Krebs	55	Chevy	GRE	SBO	RCH	IOW; DNQ	BGS	JFC	LGY	NHA	COL	GRE	NHA	DOV	N/A	0	

==== K&N Pro Series West ====
NASCAR K&N Pro Series West results
Year	Team	No.	Make	1	2	3	4	5	6	7	8	9	10	11	12	13	14	15	NKNPSWC	Pts	Ref
2010	Charlie Silva	5	Chevy	AAS; 22	PHO	IOW				PIR; 22									15th	880	
2010	Ark Krebs	51	Chevy				DCS; 9	SON	IRW		MRP; 13	CNS; 11	MMP; DNQ	AAS; 19	PHO; 17				15th	880	
2011	Sellers Racing	15	Chevy	PHO; 29															12th	1363	
2011	Art Krebs	55	Chevy		AAS; 12	MMP; 34	IOW; DNQ												12th	1363	
2011	Charlie Silva	5	Chevy					LVS; 8	SON; 29	IRW; 25	EVG; 17	PIR; 17	CNS; 19	MRP; 19					12th	1363	
2011	Dave Philpott	54	Dodge												SPO; 12				12th	1363	
2011	GSR Racing	01	Ford													AAS; 15	PHO		12th	1363	
2012	Marv Brown	30	Chevy	PHO; 28															34th	82	
2012	Mike Holleran	38	Chevy		LHC; 22	MMP; 27													34th	82	
2012	GSR Racing	07	Ford				S99; 17	IOW	BIR	LVS	SON	EVG	CNS	IOW	PIR; 14	SMP	AAS	PHO	34th	82	
2014	Sellers Racing	11	Chevy	PHO	IRW	S99	IOW	KCR	SON	SLS; 17				KCR; 7	MMP	AAS	PHO; 18		14th	179	
2014	Sellers Racing	15	Chevy								CNS; 15		EVG; 19						14th	179	
2014	Sellers Racing	51	Chevy									IOW; 9							14th	179	
2015	Sellers Racing	15	Chevy	KCR; 20	IRW; 24	TUS	IOW												32nd	76	
2015	Charlie Silva	5	Chevy					SHA; 12	SON	SLS	IOW	EVG	CNS	MER	AAS	PHO			32nd	76	
2017	Charlie Silva	5	Chevy	TUS; 24	KCR; 23	IRW	IRW	SPO	OSS	CNS	SON	IOW	EVG	DCS	MER	AAS	KCR		39th	41	
