= Carlos Vieira =

American racing driver (born 1972)

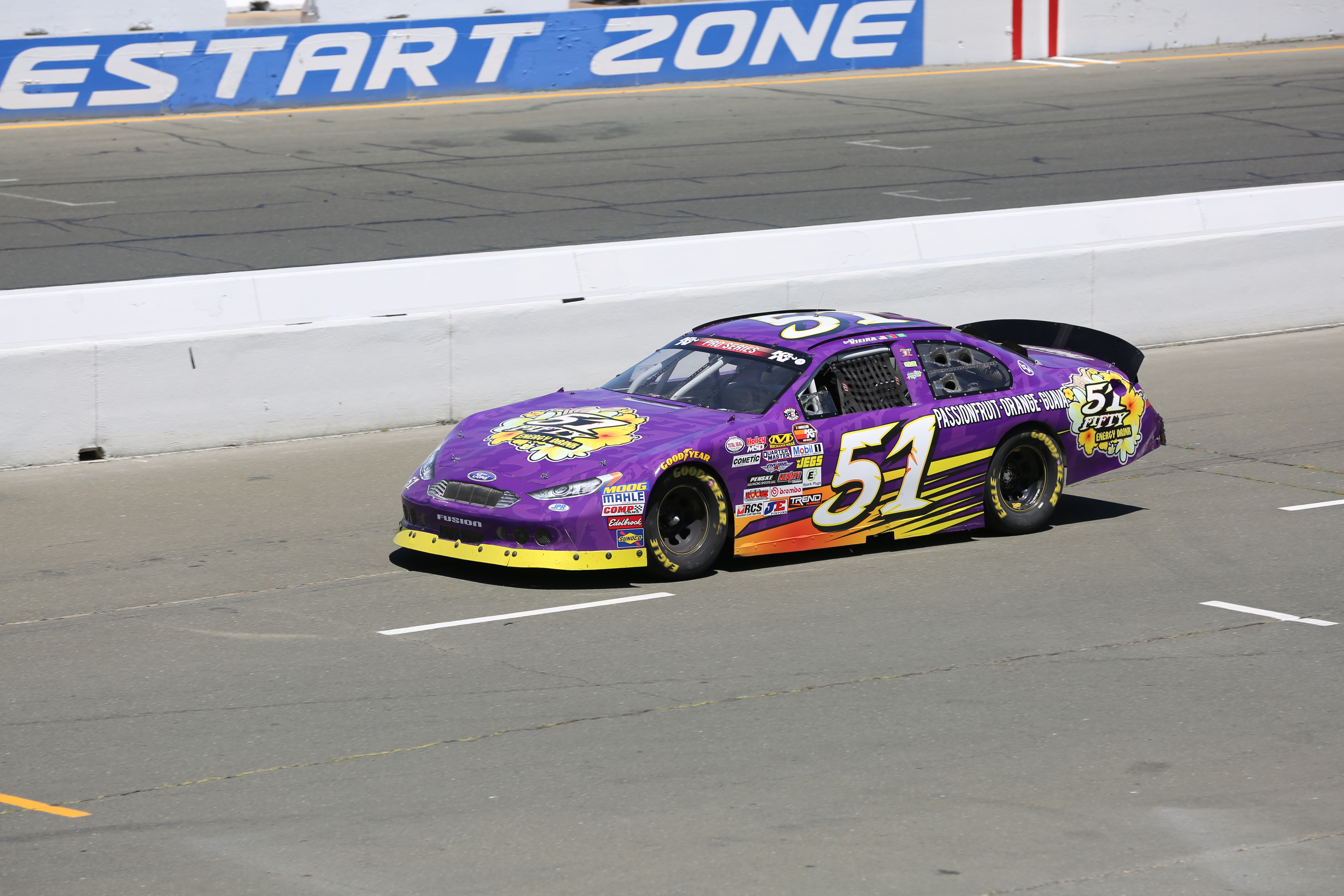
- Vieira's No. 51 car at Sonoma Raceway in 2018
- Born: February 23, 1972 (age 54); Atwater, California, U.S.

ARCA Menards Series West career
- 24 races run over 9 years
- Best finish: 18th (2014)
- First race: 2011 3 Amigos Organic Blanco 100 (Phoenix)
- Last race: 2019 Procore 200 (Sonoma)
Wins	Top tens	Poles
0	2	0
- Statistics up to date as of November 16, 2024.

Carlos Vieira (born February 23, 1972) is an American professional stock car racing driver who competed in the NASCAR K&N Pro Series West from 2011 to 2019.

Vieira has also competed in the SRL Spears Southwest Tour Series, the Pacific Challenge Series, and the Westcar Late Model Series.

== Motorsports results ==
=== NASCAR ===
(key) (Bold - Pole position awarded by qualifying time. Italics - Pole position earned by points standings or practice time. * – Most laps led.)

==== K&N Pro Series West ====
NASCAR K&N Pro Series West results
Year	Team	No.	Make	1	2	3	4	5	6	7	8	9	10	11	12	13	14	15	NKNPSWC	Pts	Ref
2011	Carlos Vieira Racing	51	Toyota	PHO; 18	AAS	MMP; 11	IOW	LVS	SON; 21	IRW; 19	EVG	PIR	CNS	MRP	SPO	AAS	PHO; 18		24th	554	
2012	Carlos Vieira Racing	51	Toyota	PHO	LHC	MMP	S99	IOW	BIR	LVS	SON; 17	EVG	CNS	IOW	PIR	SMP	AAS	PHO	72nd	27	
2013	Carlos Vieira Racing	51	Toyota	PHO; 12	S99; 17	BIR	IOW	L44	SON; 32	CNS	IOW	EVG	SRP	MMP	SMP	AAS; 12	KCR; 15	PHO	20th	132	
2014	Carlos Vieira Racing	51	Chevy	PHO; 12	IRW; 10	S99	IOW	KCR						KCR; 18	MMP				18th	154	
2014	Carlos Vieira Racing	51	Toyota						SON; 15	SLS	CNS	IOW	EVG			AAS; 11	PHO		18th	154	
2015	Carlos Vieira Racing	51	Toyota	KCR; 11	IRW; 16	TUS	IOW	SHA; 15	SON; 37	SLS	IOW	EVG	CNS	MER	AAS	PHO			22nd	97	
2016	Carlos Vieira Racing	51	Chevy	IRW	KCR	TUS	OSS	CNS	SON; 9	SLS	IOW	EVG	DCS	UMC	UMC	MER	AAS		42nd	35	
2017	Carlos Vieira Racing	51	Chevy	TUS	KCR	IRW	IRW	SPO	OSS	CNS	SON; 12	IOW	EVG	DCS	MER	AAS	KCR		49th	32	
2018	Jefferson Pitts Racing	51	Ford	KCR	TUS	TUS	OSS	CNS	SON; 22	DCS	IOW	EVG	GTW	LVS	MER	AAS	KCR		59th	22	
2019	Carlos Vieira Racing	51	Chevy	LVS	IRW	TUS	TUS	CNS	SON; 21	DCS	IOW	EVG	GTW	MER	AAS	KCR	PHO		61st	23	
