= Taylor Cuzick =

American racing driver (born 1991)

- Born: April 30, 1991 (age 35); Tolleson, Arizona, U.S.

ARCA Menards Series West career
- 32 races run over 4 years
- Best finish: 6th (2013)
- First race: 2011 3 Amigos Organic Blanco 100 (Phoenix)
- Last race: 2014 Casino Arizona 100 (Phoenix)
Wins	Top tens	Poles
0	17	0
- Statistics up to date as of November 16, 2024.

Taylor Cuzick (born April 30, 1991) is an American former professional stock car racing driver and who has competed in the NASCAR K&N Pro Series West from 2011 to 2014.

Cuzick has also previously competed in series such as the Gene Price Motorsports Late Model River Series, the ASA Truck Series, the Inland Northwest Super Stock Association, and the Westcar Late Model Series.

== Motorsports results ==
=== NASCAR ===
(key) (Bold - Pole position awarded by qualifying time. Italics - Pole position earned by points standings or practice time. * – Most laps led.)

==== K&N Pro Series East ====
NASCAR K&N Pro Series East results
Year	Team	No.	Make	1	2	3	4	5	6	7	8	9	10	11	12	13	14	NKNPSEC	Pts	Ref
2012	Jamee Price	42	Chevy	BRI	GRE	RCH	IOW; DNQ	BGS	JFC	LGY	CNB	COL	IOW	NHA	DOV	GRE	CAR	N/A	0	

==== K&N Pro Series West ====
NASCAR K&N Pro Series West results
Year	Team	No.	Make	1	2	3	4	5	6	7	8	9	10	11	12	13	14	15	NKNPSWC	Pts	Ref
2011	Danny Cuzick	42	Chevy	PHO; 36	AAS	MMP	IOW; 10			IRW; 27	EVG	PIR	CNS	MRP	SPO	AAS	PHO		36th	401	
2011	Danny Cuzick	42	Dodge					LVS; 11	SON										36th	401	
2012	Jamee Price	42	Ford	PHO	LHC	MMP; 14	S99									SMP; 4	AAS		18th	224	
2012	Jamee Price	42	Chevy					IOW; DNQ	BIR	LVS; 9	SON	EVG; 14	CNS; 18	IOW	PIR			PHO; 14	18th	224	
2013	Danny Cuzick	42	Chevy	PHO; 10			IOW; 11				IOW; 7	EVG; 6		MMP; 11		AAS; 22			6th	475	
2013	Danny Cuzick	42	Ford		S99; 20	BIR; 7		L44; 8	SON; 23	CNS; 7			SPO; 14		SMP; 6		KCR; 23		6th	475	
2013	Danny Cuzick	42	Dodge															PHO; 10	6th	475	
2014	Danny Cuzick	42	Dodge	PHO; 10			IOW; 9	KCR	SON	SLS	CNS	IOW	EVG						12th	249	
2014	Danny Cuzick	42	Ford		IRW; 9	S99; 7								KCR; 6	MMP; 7	AAS			12th	249	
2014	Danny Cuzick	42	Chevy														PHO; 11		12th	249	
