= Greg Pursley =

American racing driver (born 1968)

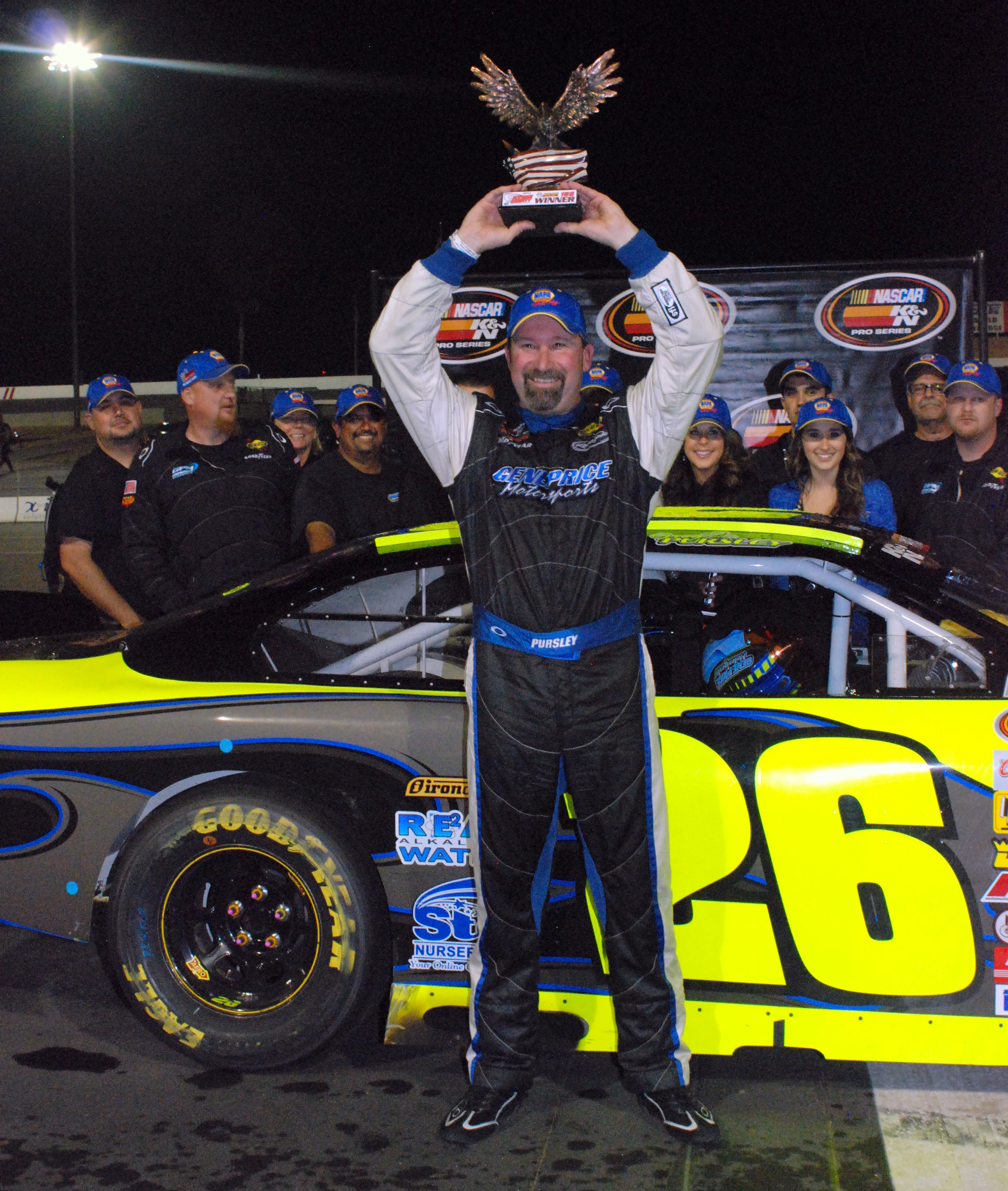
- Pursley after a win at Kern County Raceway Park in 2013.
- Born: January 4, 1968 (age 58) Newhall, California, U.S.

NASCAR K&N Pro Series West career
- Debut season: 1999
- Current team: Gene Price Motorsports
- Car number: 26
- Starts: 87
- Wins: 11
- Poles: 14
- Best finish: 1st in 2011, 2014

Previous series
- 2001–2006: AutoZone Elite Division, Southwest Series

Championship titles
- 2011, 2014: K&N Pro Series West

Awards
- West Coast Stock Car Hall of Fame (2018)

NASCAR FedEx Freight Truck Series career
- 4 races run over 2 years
- Best finish: 62nd (2010)
- First race: 2010 Lucas Oil 200 (Iowa)
- Last race: 2011 Lucas Oil 150 (Phoenix)
Wins	Top tens	Poles
0	1	0
- Statistics up to date as of March 27, 2014.

Greg Pursley (born January 4, 1968) is an American former professional stock car racing driver. The 2011 and 2014 champion of the NASCAR K&N Pro Series West, he drove for Gene Price Motorsports.

== Career ==
Pursley won the NASCAR Weekly Series national championship in 2004. Driving an asphalt Super Late Model for owner Dave Hays, Pursley won 13 of the 18 races that he entered at Irwindale Speedway in California.

Pursely has competed in the NASCAR Camping World Truck Series on a limited basis, but primarily competes in the NASCAR K&N Pro Series West, winning the 2011 championship, and also again in 2014, and scoring 18 wins in the series since his debut in 1999.

== Motorsports career results ==
=== NASCAR ===
(key) (Bold – Pole position awarded by qualifying time. Italics – Pole position earned by points standings or practice time. * – Most laps led.)

==== Busch Series ====
NASCAR Busch Series results
Year	Team	No.	Make	1	2	3	4	5	6	7	8	9	10	11	12	13	14	15	16	17	18	19	20	21	22	23	24	25	26	27	28	29	30	31	32	33	34	NBSC	Pts	Ref
2003	Brian Weber Racing	84	Chevy	DAY	CAR	LVS	DAR	BRI	TEX	TAL	NSH	CAL; DNQ	RCH	GTY	NZH	CLT	DOV	NSH	KEN	MLW	DAY	CHI	NHA	PPR	IRP	MCH	BRI	DAR	RCH	DOV	KAN	CLT	MEM	ATL	PHO	CAR	HOM	NA	-	

==== Camping World Truck Series ====
NASCAR Camping World Truck Series results
Year	Team	No.	Make	1	2	3	4	5	6	7	8	9	10	11	12	13	14	15	16	17	18	19	20	21	22	23	24	25	NCWTC	Pts	Ref
2010	Gene Price Motorsports	62	Chevy	DAY	ATL	MAR	NSH	KAN	DOV	CLT	TEX	MCH	IOW; 8	GTY	IRP	POC	NSH	DAR	BRI	CHI	KEN	NHA	LVS; 33	MAR	TAL	TEX	PHO; 17	HOM	62nd	318	
2011	Gene Price Motorsports	44	Chevy	DAY	PHO; 28	DAR	MAR	NSH	DOV	CLT	KAN	TEX	KEN	IOW	NSH	IRP	POC	MCH	BRI	ATL	CHI	NHA	KEN	LVS	TAL	MAR	TEX	HOM	70th	16	

==== K&N Pro Series West ====
NASCAR K&N Pro Series West results
Year	Team	No.	Make	1	2	3	4	5	6	7	8	9	10	11	12	13	14	15	NKNPSWC	Pts	Ref
1999	Info not available	98	Ford	TUS	LVS	PHO	CAL	PPR	MMR	IRW	EVG	POR	IRW	RMR	LVS	MMR; 11	MOT		64th	130	
2002	Performance P-1 Motorsports	77	Ford	PHO; 5	LVS; 6*	CAL; 12	KAN; 11	EVG; 15	IRW; 4	S99; 7	RMR; 21	DCS; 9	LVS; 11						9th	1364	
2007	Performance P-1 Motorsports	70	Ford	CTS	PHO	AMP	ELK	IOW	CNS	SON	DCS	IRW; 29	MMP	EVG	CSR	AMP			69th	76	
2008	Gene Price Motorsports	70	Chevy	AAS	PHO; 24	CTS	IOW; 11	CNS	SON; 37	IRW	DCS	EVG	MMP	IRW; 29	AMP	AAS			32nd	349	
2009	Gene Price Motorsports	26	Chevy	CTS; 1	AAS; 6	PHO; 5	MAD; 5	IOW; 12	DCS; 8		IRW; 5			CNS; 4	IOW; 7	AAS; 3			3rd	1978	
2009	Gene Price Motorsports	26	Ford							SON; 20		PIR; 2	MMP; 4						3rd	1978	
2010	Gene Price Motorsports	26	Ford	AAS; 6	PHO; 3	IOW; 17	DCS; 6	SON; 27	**IRW**; 29	PIR; 9	**MRP**; 18	CNS; 4	MMP; 1	AAS; 18	**PHO**; 1				5th	1641	
2011	Gene Price Motorsports	26	Ford	PHO; 1*	**AAS**; 3*	MMP; 1	IOW; 1	**LVS**; 1*	SON; 4	**IRW**; 1*	**EVG**; 1	PIR; 26*	CNS; 2	**MRP**; 4	SPO; 3	AAS; 2	**PHO**; 23*		1st	2324	
2012	Gene Price Motorsports	26	Ford	PHO; 4	LHC; 10	**MMP**; 1*	S99; 4	IOW; 2	BIR; 3	LVS; 1*	**SON**; 3*	**EVG**; 6	CNS; 1*	IOW; 5	**PIR**; 1*	SMP; 8	AAS; 13	PHO; 6	2nd	616	
2013	Gene Price Motorsports	26	Ford	**PHO**; 1*	S99; 10	BIR; 3	**IOW**; 2	L44; 9	SON; 21	CNS; 5	IOW; 1	EVG; 2	SPO; 1	MMP; 2	SMP; 1	AAS; 5	KCR; 1*	PHO; 14	3rd	607	
2014	Gene Price Motorsports	26	Chevy	PHO; 4			IOW; 2					IOW; 1					PHO; 9		1st	577	
2014	Gene Price Motorsports	26	Ford		IRW; 3	S99; 2		**KCR**; 1*	SON; 2	SLS; 2	CNS; 4		EVG; 11	**KCR**; 9*	**MMP**; 4*	AAS; 4			1st	577	
2015	Jefferson Pitts Racing	26	Ford	KCR	IRW	TUS	IOW	SHA	SON	SLS	IOW	EVG	CNS	MER	AAS	PHO; 15			55th	29	

^{*} Season still in progress
^{1} Ineligible for series points

Sporting positions
Preceded by Eric Holmes; Derek Thorn	NASCAR K&N Pro Series West Champion; 2011; 2014	Succeeded by Dylan Kwasniewski; Chris Eggleston
