= Dave Smith (racing driver) =

American racing driver (born 1967)

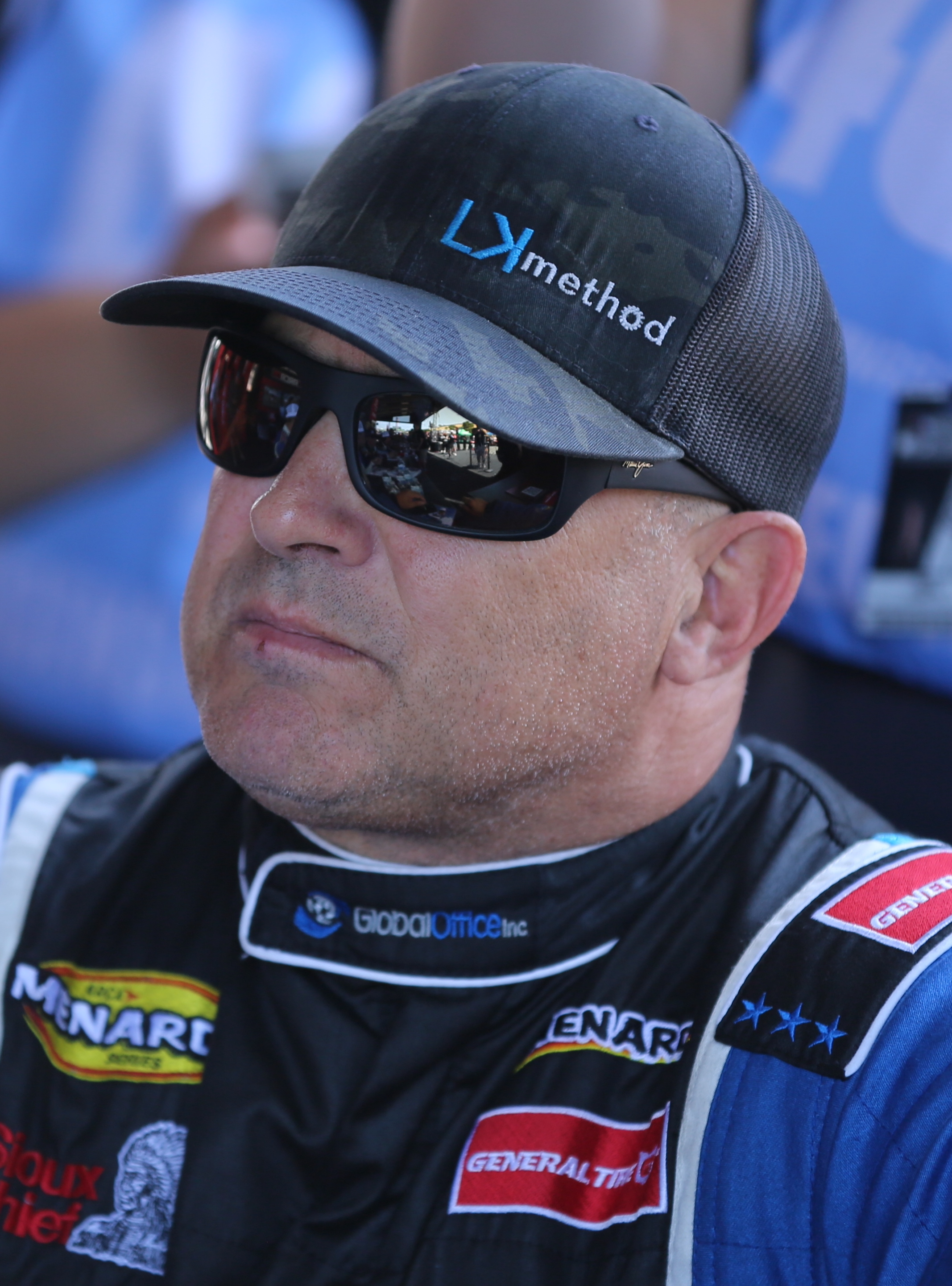
- Smith at Sonoma Raceway in 2024
- Born: David M. Smith; February 19, 1967 (age 59); Novato, California, U.S.

NASCAR O'Reilly Auto Parts Series career
- 1 race run over 1 year
- 2021 position: 69th
- Best finish: 69th (2021)
- First race: 2021 Skrewball Peanut Butter Whiskey 200 at The Glen (Watkins Glen)
| Wins | Top tens | Poles |
|---|---|---|
| 0 | 0 | 0 |

ARCA Menards Series West career
- 16 races run over 11 years
- Best finish: 30th (2021)
- First race: 2010 Thunder Valley Casino Resort 200 (Sonoma)
- Last race: 2026 General Tire 150 (Sonoma)
| Wins | Top tens | Poles |
|---|---|---|
| 0 | 3 | 0 |
- Statistics up to date as of June 26, 2026.

David M. Smith (born February 19, 1967) is an American professional racing driver. He last competed part-time in the ARCA Menards Series West, driving the No. 77 Toyota Camry for Performance P–1 Motorsports.

== Racing career ==
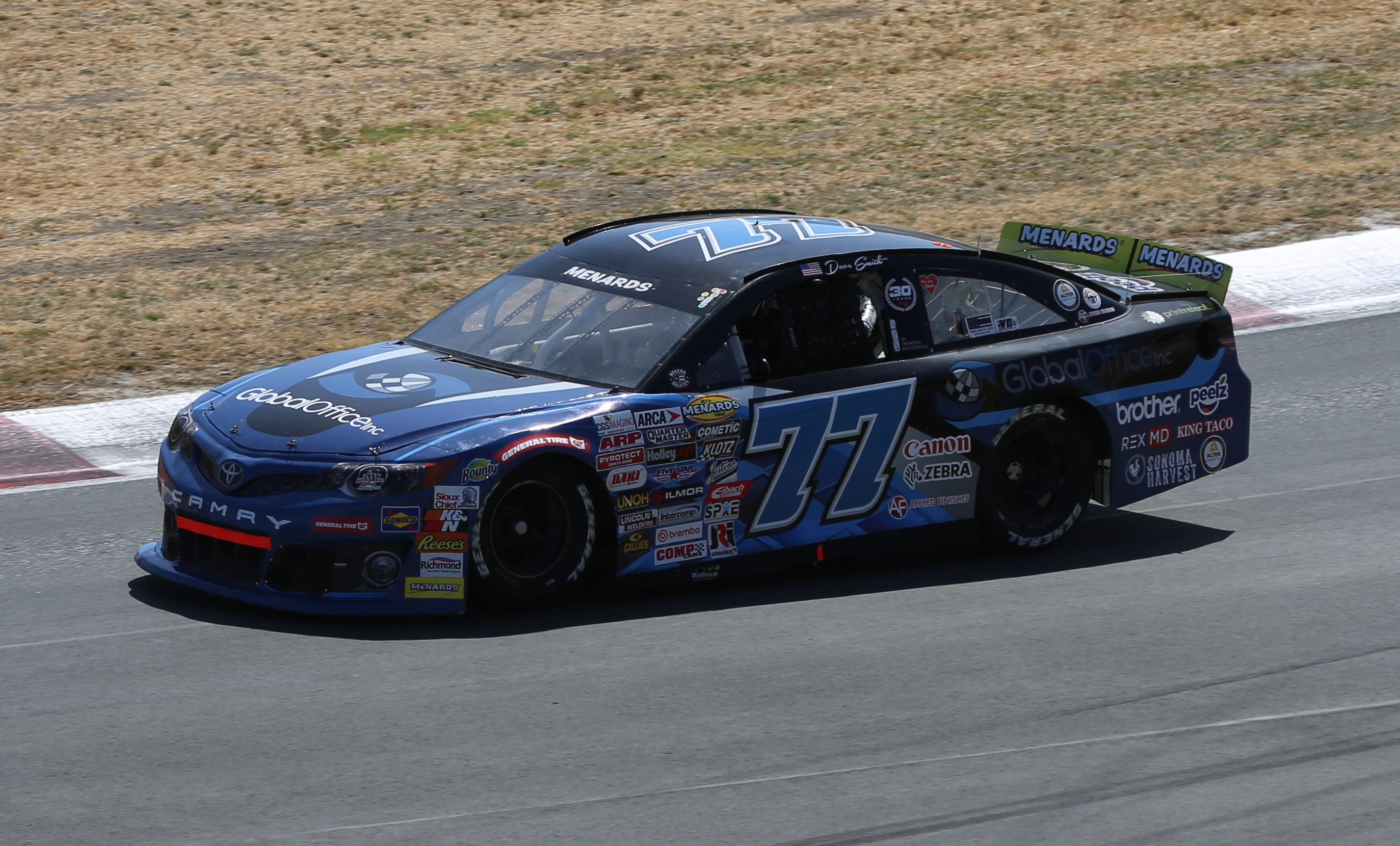
Smith's No. 77 car at Sonoma Raceway in 2024

Smith started racing in the NASCAR K&N Pro Series Series West in 2010, running a few races every year, mostly at the Sonoma Raceway. On August 10, 2021, it was announced that Smith would make his NASCAR Xfinity Series debut in the race at Watkins Glen International. He would drive the Jimmy Means Racing No. 52 car. Smith started the race in 38th, finishing in 33rd.

== Motorsports career results ==
=== NASCAR ===
(key) (Bold – Pole position awarded by qualifying time. Italics – Pole position earned by points standings or practice time. * – Most laps led.)

==== Xfinity Series ====
NASCAR Xfinity Series results
| Year | Team | No. | Make | 1 | 2 | 3 | 4 | 5 | 6 | 7 | 8 | 9 | 10 | 11 | 12 | 13 | 14 | 15 | 16 | 17 | 18 | 19 | 20 | 21 | 22 | 23 | 24 | 25 | 26 | 27 | 28 | 29 | 30 | 31 | 32 | 33 | NXSC | Pts | Ref |
|---|---|---|---|---|---|---|---|---|---|---|---|---|---|---|---|---|---|---|---|---|---|---|---|---|---|---|---|---|---|---|---|---|---|---|---|---|---|---|---|
| 2021 | Jimmy Means Racing | 52 | Chevy | DAY | DAY | HOM | LVS | PHO | ATL | MAR | TAL | DAR | DOV | COA | CLT | MOH | TEX | NSH | POC | ROA | ATL | NHA | GLN; 33 | IND | MCH | DAY | DAR | RCH | BRI | LVS | TAL | CLT | TEX | KAN | MAR | PHO | 69th | 4 | |

==== ARCA Menards Series West ====
ARCA Menards Series West results
| Year | Team Owner | No. | Make | 1 | 2 | 3 | 4 | 5 | 6 | 7 | 8 | 9 | 10 | 11 | 12 | 13 | 14 | 15 | AMSWC | Pts | Ref |
|---|---|---|---|---|---|---|---|---|---|---|---|---|---|---|---|---|---|---|---|---|---|
| 2010 | Brenn McGowan | 11 | Chevy | AAS | PHO | IOW | DCS | SON; 13 | IRW | PIR | MRP | CNS | MMP | AAS | PHO | | | | 63rd | 124 | |
| 2011 | Steve Tarpley | 48 | Chevy | PHO | AAS | MMP | IOW | LVS | SON; 32 | IRW | EVG | | | | | | | | 55th | 222 | |
| 2011 | Naake-Klauer Motorsports | 88 | Chevy | | | | | | | | | PIR; 5 | CNS | MRP | SPO | AAS | PHO | | 55th | 222 | |
| 2012 | Mike Holleran | 38 | Ford | PHO | LHC | MMP | S99 | IOW | BIR | LVS | SON; 26 | EVG | CNS | IOW | PIR | SMP | AAS | PHO | 84th | 18 | |
| 2013 | Naake-Klauer Motorsports | 88 | Chevy | PHO | S99 | BIR | IOW | L44 | SON; 10 | CNS | IOW | EVG | SPO | MMP | SMP | AAS | KCR | PHO | 53rd | 34 | |
| 2014 | Kevin McCarty | 36 | Chevy | PHO | IRW | S99 | IOW | KCR | SON; 27 | SLS | CNS | IOW | EVG | KCR | | | | | 34th | 72 | |
| 2014 | Kevin McCarty | 36 | Toyota | | | | | | | | | | | | MMP; 18 | | | | 34th | 72 | |
| 2014 | Mike Holleran | 38 | Toyota | | | | | | | | | | | | | AAS; 15 | PHO | | 34th | 72 | |
| 2015 | Mike Holleran | 38 | Dodge | KCR | IRW | TUS | IOW | SHA | SON; 29 | SLS | IOW | EVG | CNS | MER | AAS | PHO | | | 72nd | 15 | |
| 2017 | Kent Smith | 30 | Ford | TUS | KCR | IRW | IRW | SPO | OSS | CNS | SON; 17 | IOW | EVG | DCS | MER | AAS | KCR | | 54th | 27 | |
| 2019 | Sue McCarty | 35 | Toyota | LVS | IRW | TUS | TUS | CNS | SON; 9 | DCS | IOW | EVG | GTW | MER | AAS | KCR | PHO | | 46th | 35 | |
| 2021 | Performance P-1 Motorsports | 77 | Toyota | PHO | SON; 17 | IRW | CNS | IRW | | | | | | | | | | | 30th | 57 | |
| 2021 | Mike Holleran | 38 | Toyota | | | | | | PIR; 14 | LVS | AAS | PHO | | | | | | | 30th | 57 | |
| 2024 | Performance P–1 Motorsports | 77 | Toyota | PHO | KER | PIR; 23 | SON; 26 | IRW | IRW | SHA | TRI | MAD | AAS | KER | PHO | | | | 43rd | 39 | |
| 2026 | Performance P–1 Motorsports | 77 | Toyota | KER | PHO | TUC | SHA | CNS | TRI | SON; 22 | PIR | AAS | MAD | LVS | PHO | KER | | | 79th | 22 | |

^{*} Season still in progress
^{1} Ineligible for series points
