= Brett Thompson (racing driver) =

American racing driver (born 1977)

- Born: June 14, 1977 (age 49); Jerome, Idaho, U.S.

NASCAR FedEx Freight Truck Series career
- 7 races run over 3 years
- Best finish: 55th (2009)
- First race: 2007 Power Stroke Diesel 200 (IRP)
- Last race: 2009 Lucas Oil 150 (Phoenix)
Wins	Top tens	Poles
0	0	0

Brett Thompson (born June 14, 1977) is an American professional stock car racing driver. He is a long-time competitor in the NASCAR K&N Pro Series West, but also has seven NASCAR Camping World Truck Series starts as well.

== Motorsports career results ==
=== NASCAR ===
(key) (Bold – Pole position awarded by qualifying time. Italics – Pole position earned by points standings or practice time. * – Most laps led.)

==== Camping World Truck Series ====
NASCAR Camping World Truck Series results
Year	Team	No.	Make	1	2	3	4	5	6	7	8	9	10	11	12	13	14	15	16	17	18	19	20	21	22	23	24	25	NCWTC	Pts	Ref
2007	Thompson Motorsports	61	Dodge	DAY	CAL	ATL	MAR	KAN	CLT	MFD	DOV	TEX	MCH	MLW	MEM	KEN	IRP; 33	NSH	BRI	GTW	NHA	LVS; 25	TAL	MAR	ATL	TEX	PHO; 33	HOM	70th	216	
2008	Thompson Motorsports	61	Dodge	DAY	CAL	ATL	MAR	KAN	CLT	MFD	DOV	TEX	MCH	MLW	MEM	KEN	IRP	NSH	BRI	GTY	NHA	LVS	TAL	MAR	ATL	TEX	PHO; 21	HOM	85th	100	
2009	Thompson Motorsports	61	Dodge	DAY	CAL; 21	ATL	MAR	KAN	CLT	DOV	TEX	MCH	MLW	MEM	KEN	IRP	NSH	BRI	CHI	IOW; 23	GTW	NHA	LVS	MAR	TAL	TEX	PHO; 20	HOM	55th	297	

==== K&N Pro Series West ====
NASCAR K&N Pro Series West results
Year	Team	No.	Make	1	2	3	4	5	6	7	8	9	10	11	12	13	14	15	NKNPSWC	Pts	Ref
2000	Thompson Motorsports	61	Chevy	PHO	MMR	LVS	CAL	LAG	IRW	POR	EVG	IRW	RMR; 7	MMR; 17	IRW; DNQ				32nd	325	
2001	Thompson Motorsports	61	Chevy	PHO; 24	LVS; 6	TUS	MMR	CAL	IRW	LAG	KAN	EVG	CNS	IRW; 13	**RMR**; 4	LVS	IRW; 10		22nd	664	
2002	Bill McAnally Racing	61	Chevy	PHO; 14	LVS; 20	CAL; 6	KAN; 6	EVG; 10	IRW; 9	S99; 8	RMR; 12	DCS; 18	LVS; 3						10th	1339	
2003	Thompson Motorsports	61	Chevy	PHO; 13	LVS; 8	CAL; 10	MAD; 17	TCR; 12	EVG; 8	IRW; 5	S99; 4	RMR; 8	DCS; 13	PHO; 10	MMR; 9				9th	1634	
2004	Thompson Motorsports	61	Chevy	PHO; 13	MMR	CAL; 7	S99	EVG; 22	IRW; 26	S99	RMR; 11	DCS; 5	PHO; 4	CNS; 17	MMR; 1	IRW; 3			16th	1359	
2005	Thompson Motorsports	61	Chevy	PHO; 23	MMR; 7	PHO; 12	S99; 7	IRW; 3	EVG; 16	S99; 8	PPR; 5	CAL; 9	DCS; 8	CTS; 7	MMR; 13				6th	1645	
2006	Thompson Motorsports	61	Chevy	PHO; 9	PHO; 18	S99; 4	IRW; 10	SON; 27	DCS; 7	IRW; 11	EVG	S99	CAL; 5	CTS; 22	AMP; 10				16th	1295	
2007	Thompson Motorsports	61	Chevy	CTS; 4	PHO; 21	AMP; 10	ELK; 10	IOW; 5	CNS; 14	SON; 18	DCS; 12	IRW; 6	MMP; 13	EVG; 18	CSR; 10	AMP; 14			8th	1683	
2008	Thompson Motorsports	61	Chevy	AAS; 19	PHO; 4	CTS; 13	IOW; 20	CNS; 10	SON	IRW; 23	DCS	EVG	MMP	IRW; 4	AMP	AAS			18th	886	
2009	Thompson Motorsports	61	Chevy	CTS; 5	AAS; 15	PHO; 9	MAD; 5	IOW; 3	DCS; 6	SON; 13	IRW; 17	PIR; 4	MMP; 12	CNS; 15	IOW; 9	AAS; 6			5th	1805	
2010	Thompson Motorsports	61	Chevy	AAS	PHO; 21	IOW; 12	DCS	SON	IRW; 3	PIR	MRP	CNS; 6	MMP	AAS	PHO; 33				23rd	606	
2011	Thompson Motorsports	61	Chevy	PHO; 5	AAS; 8	MMP; 22	IOW; 3	LVS; 12	SON; 15	IRW; 16	EVG; 19	PIR; 6	CNS; 3	MRP; 6	SPO; 7	AAS; 12	PHO; 34		6th	1824	
2012	Thompson Motorsports	61	Chevy	PHO; 12	LHC	MMP; 20	S99	IOW; DNQ	BIR; 13	LVS	SON	EVG	CNS	IOW; DNQ	PIR; 11	SMP	AAS	PHO; 9	19th	216	
2013	Thompson Motorsports	61	Chevy	PHO; 8	S99; 8	BIR; 18	IOW; 15	L44; 16	SON; 17	CNS; 9	IOW	EVG	SPO	MMP	SMP	AAS	KCR	PHO; 8	14th	253	
2014	Thompson Motorsports	61	Chevy	PHO; 9	IRW; 7*	S99	IOW	KCR	SON	SLS	CNS; 7	IOW	EVG	KCR	MMP; 6	AAS	PHO; 19		15th	174	
2015	Thompson Motorsports	61	Chevy	KCR; 8	IRW; 8	TUS; 13	IOW; 11	SHA; 11	SON; 33	SLS	IOW	EVG	CNS	MER; 9	AAS				14th	231	
2015	Thompson Motorsports	61	Ford													PHO; 28			14th	231	

==== K&N Pro Series East ====
NASCAR K&N Pro Series East results
Year	Team	No.	Make	1	2	3	4	5	6	7	8	9	10	11	12	13	14	NKNPSEC	Pts	Ref
2005	Thompson Motorsports	81	Chevy	STA	HOL	ERI	NHA	WFD	ADI	STA	DUB	OXF	NHA	DOV; 10	LRP	TMP		51st	139	
2006	Thompson Motorsports	81	Chevy	GRE	STA	HOL	TMP	ERI	NHA	ADI	WFD	NHA	DOV; 25	LRP				60th	88	
2012	Thompson Motorsports	61	Chevy	BRI	GRE	RCH	IOW; DNQ	BGS	JFC	LGY	CNB	COL	IOW; DNQ	NHA	DOV	GRE	CAR	N/A	0	
