= Zack Huffman =

American racing driver (born 1994)

- Born: January 9, 1994 (age 32); Manteca, California, U.S.

ARCA Menards Series West career
- 11 races run over 2 years
- Best finish: 11th (2014)
- First race: 2012 NAPA Auto Parts 150 (Evergreen)
- Last race: 2014 Casino Arizona 100 (Phoenix)
Wins	Top tens	Poles
0	1	0
- Statistics up to date as of November 24, 2024.

Zack Huffman (born January 9, 1994) is an American former professional stock car racing driver who competed in the NASCAR K&N Pro Series West from 2012 to 2014.

Huffman has also competed in the Pacific Challenge Series and the Westcar Late Model Series.

== Motorsports results ==
=== NASCAR ===
(key) (Bold - Pole position awarded by qualifying time. Italics - Pole position earned by points standings or practice time. * – Most laps led.)

==== K&N Pro Series West ====
NASCAR K&N Pro Series West results
Year	Team	No.	Make	1	2	3	4	5	6	7	8	9	10	11	12	13	14	15	NKNPSWC	Pts	Ref
2012	Mike Holleran	38	Ford	PHO	LHC	MMP	S99	IOW	BIR	LVS	SON	EVG; 20	CNS; 17	IOW	PIR; 27	SMP	AAS	PHO	37th	68	
2014	Bob Wood	14	Toyota	PHO	IRW	S99; 12	IOW												11th	251	
2014	Nicklaus Sommer	30	Toyota					KCR; 11											11th	251	
2014	Mike Holleran	38	Toyota						SON; Wth	SLS	CNS				MMP; 9				11th	251	
2014	Mike Holleran	38	Chevy									IOW; 14							11th	251	
2014	Bob Wood	14	Chevy										EVG; 13			AAS; 13			11th	251	
2014	Mike Holleran	38	Ford											KCR; 11					11th	251	
2014	Michael Giannone	54	Toyota														PHO; 32		11th	251	
