= 2010 NASCAR K&N Pro Series West =

57th season of the NASCAR K&N Pro Series West

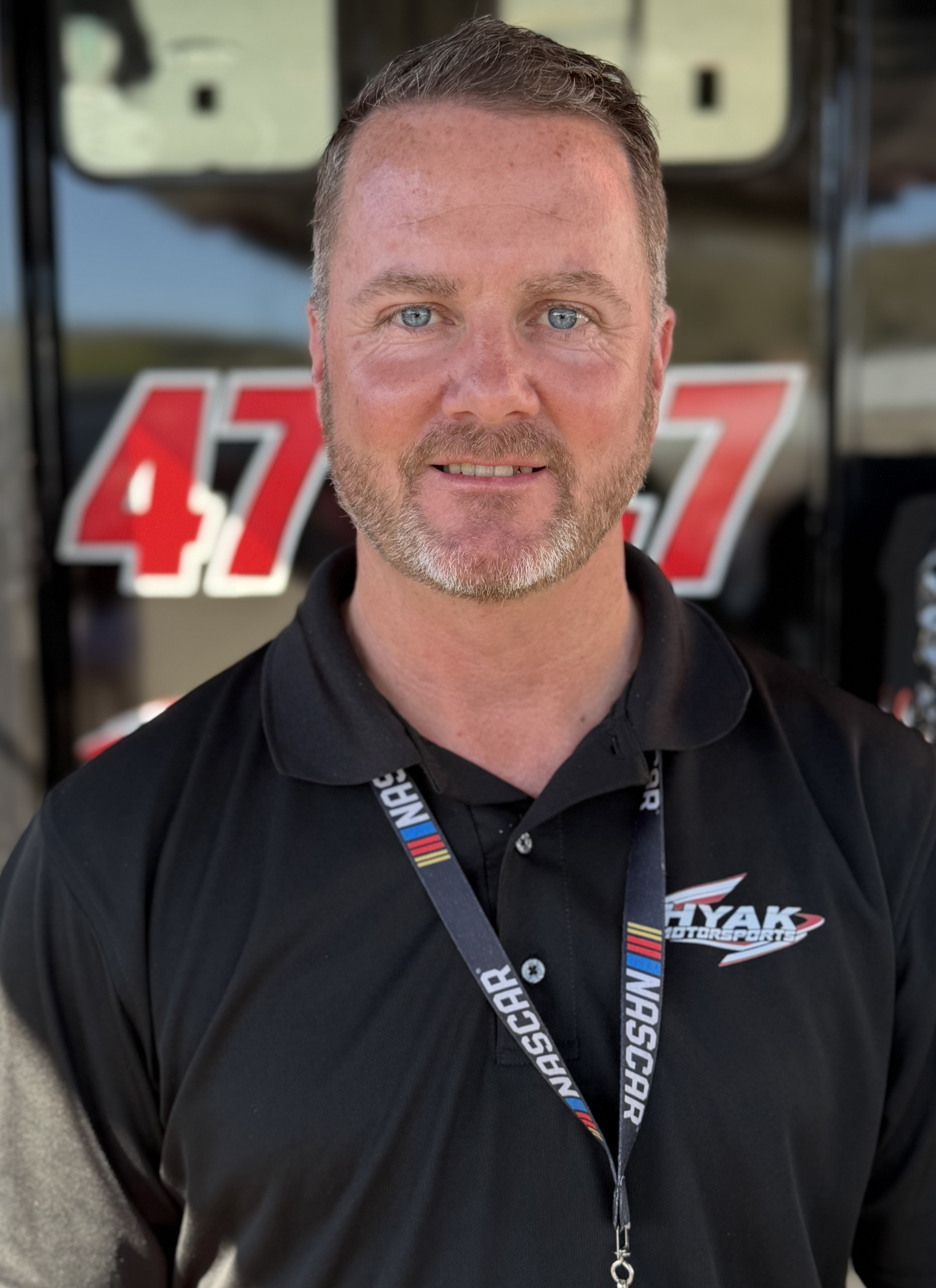
Eric Holmes, the 2010 NASCAR K&N Pro Series West champion

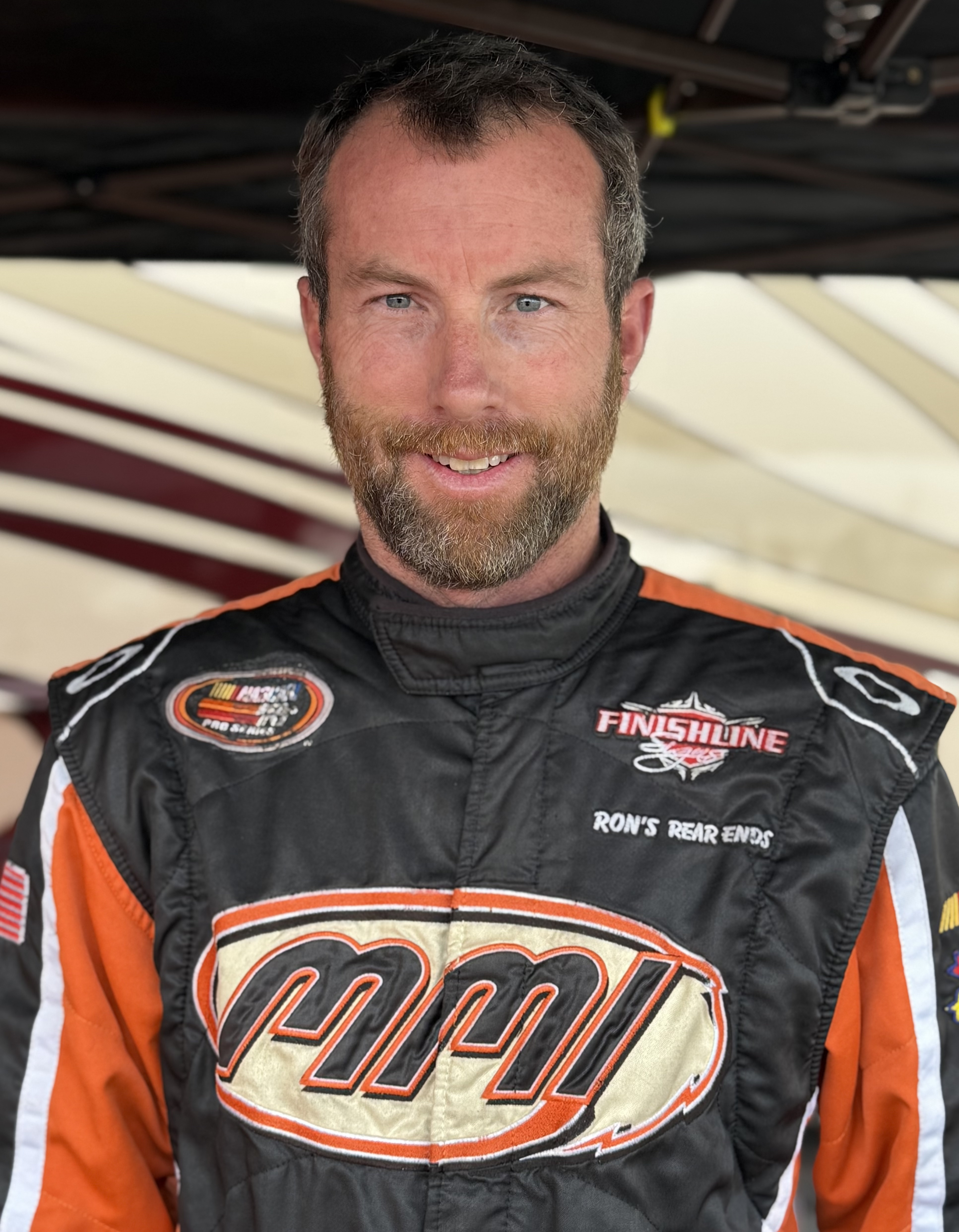
David Mayhew finished second behind Holmes in the championship by 123 points.

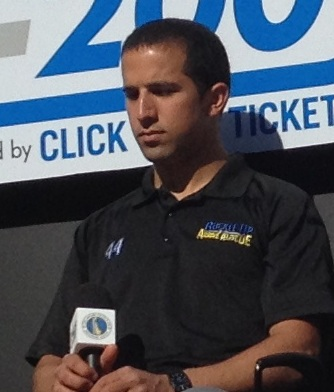
Paulie Harraka finished third in the championship.

The 2010 NASCAR K&N Pro Series West was the 57th season of the NASCAR K&N Pro Series West, a regional stock car racing series sanctioned by NASCAR, and the first with title sponsor K&N. It began with the Toyota / NAPA Auto Parts Bonus Challenge at All American Speedway on March 27, 2010, and concluded with the 3 Amigos Tequila 125 at Phoenix International Raceway on November 13, 2010. Eric Holmes won the championship, 123 points ahead of David Mayhew.

== Schedule and results ==
The 2010 season included 12 individual races, although All American Speedway and Phoenix International Raceway hosted two races each. The race at Iowa Speedway was in combination with the NASCAR K&N Pro Series East.

Date	Name	Racetrack	Location	Winner
March 27	Toyota / NAPA Auto Parts Bonus Challenge	All American Speedway	Roseville, California	Paulie Harraka
April 8	Jimmie Johnson Foundation 100	Phoenix International Raceway	Avondale, Arizona	Eric Holmes
May 23	Goodyear Dealers of Iowa 200	Iowa Speedway	Newton, Iowa	Max Gresham
June 5	Toyota / NAPA Auto Parts Bonus Challenge	Douglas County Speedway	Roseburg, Oregon	Eric Holmes
June 19	Thunder Valley Casino Resort 200	Infineon Raceway	Sonoma, California	Andrew Ranger
July 3	King Taco 200	Irwindale Speedway	Irwindale, California	Auggie Vidovich
July 18	Bi-Mart Salute to the Troops 125	Portland International Raceway	Portland, Oregon	Patrick Long
August 7	Toyota / NAPA Auto Parts Bonus Challenge 150	Montana Raceway Park	Kalispell, Montana	Eric Holmes
August 14	Toyota / NAPA Auto Parts Bonus Challenge 150	Colorado National Speedway	Erie, Colorado	Eric Holmes
September 12	Toyota / NAPA Auto Parts Bonus Challenge	Miller Motorsports Park	Tooele, Utah	Greg Pursley
October 16	Toyota / NAPA Auto Parts 150	All American Speedway	Roseville, California	Eric Holmes
November 13	3 Amigos Tequila 125	Phoenix International Raceway	Avondale, Arizona	Greg Pursley

== Full Drivers' Championship ==
(key) Bold – Pole position awarded by time. Italics – Pole position set by owner's points. * – Most laps led.

Pos	Driver	AAS	PHO	IOW	DCS	SON	IRW	PIR	MRP	CNS	MMP	AAS	PHO	Pts
1	Eric Holmes	20	1	3 (Note: Finished 10th overall)	1*	4	10	2	1	1*	6	**1***	15	1945
2	David Mayhew	4	5	**1*** (Note: Finished 5th overall)	**2**	23	23	**4**	2*	5	15	2	7*	1822
3	Paulie Harraka	**1***	29	18 (Note: Finished 41st overall)	5	2	13	3	11	2	3	4	25	1707
4	Moses Smith	8	16	14 (Note: Finished 34th overall)	4	9	4	15	3	15	4	8	10	1678
5	Greg Pursley	6	3	17 (Note: Finished 39th overall)	6	27	**29**	9	**18**	4	1	18	**1**	1641
6	Jonathon Gomez	23	4	2 (Note: Finished 8th overall)	10	11	6	12	4	13	21	7	11	1630
7	Luis Martinez Jr.	5	17	9 (Note: Finished 26th overall)	19	7	9	5	9	**3**	19	6	28	1593
8	Michael Self	14	10	13 (Note: Finished 33rd overall)	17	5	11	11	8	7	28	12	8	1552
9	Todd Souza	10	8	DNQ	7	6	28	13	10	8	12	21	14	1496
10	Travis Milburn	7	18	DNQ	14	16	30	8	16	12	10	11	21	1412
11	Troy Ermish	19	33	DNQ	8	33	21	25	17	9	8	14	13	1304
12	Greg Rayl	18	19	15 (Note: Finished 35th overall)	16	26	22	18	15	14	13	17	36	1269
13	Blake Koch	9	28	5 (Note: Finished 13th overall)	3	29	2	6	7	10				1223
14	Jack Sellers	17	20	19 (Note: Finished 44th overall)	18	18	19	21	19	19	27	16		1154
15	Justin Funkhouser	22			9			22	13	11	DNQ	19	17	880
16	Wes Banks	13	32	16 (Note: Finished 37th overall)	13	10					DNQ	13	19	861
17	Josh Combs	2	15	11 (Note: Finished 30th overall)	12	31	15	16						848
18	Daryl Harr		6	6 (Note: Finished 16th overall)		35			6		9		9	789
19	Stan Silva Jr.		7	7 (Note: Finished 21st overall)		25	27	7			14		37	781
20	Jonathan Hale	16	12	DNQ	11	21	20							669
21	Taylor Barton	11	9	10 (Note: Finished 27th overall)			12			16				644
22	Auggie Vidovich	21	14			DNQ	1*						4	620
23	Brett Thompson		21	12 (Note: Finished 31st overall)			3			6			33	606
24	Kyle Kelley	12	22					26			5			464
25	Gary Lewis	3							5		25		39	454
26	Brandon Davis					3	25	20			24			452
27	Brian Wong		23			30	26	19					24	449
28	Thomas Martin								14	18	16	22		442
29	Brennan Newberry			8 (Note: Finished 22nd overall)			16						6	412
30	Patrick Long							1*			**22***		18	411
31	Jason Bowles		2			**22**						9		410
32	Jim Inglebright					8		24			11			363
33	Carl Harr		26						20		DNQ		34	322
34	Chad Boat			4 (Note: Finished 12th overall)			17						DNQ	303
35	Dusty Davis						8						5	297
36	Scott Ivie					12		27			26			294
37	Andrew Ranger					1							20	288
38	Paul Pedroncelli Jr.	15				20							35	279
39	Garland Self					15		23			DNQ			273
40	Tom Dyer					34		14					29	258
41	Jacob Gomes											10	16	254
42	Robbie Brand						14						12	248
43	Travis Bennett								12	17				239
44	Rodd Kneeland				15							15		236
45	Hershel McGriff							17			17			224
46	Timmy Hill						7						30	219
47	Dennis Dyer		25			24							DNQ	219
48	Toni Marie McCray		13										26	209
49	Billy Kann		DNQ				18						DNQ	207
50	Brian Jackson		DNQ			32					DNQ			195
51	Justin Johnson						24						22	188
52	Eric Curran										2			170
53	Michael Waltrip												2	170
54	Eric Schmidt											3		165
55	Ty Dillon												3	165
56	Chris Johnson						5							155
57	Juan Pitta											5		155
58	Tony Toste										7			146
59	Brett Moffitt		11*											140
60	Tom Klauer							10						134
61	Johnny Borneman III		24										40	134
62	Boris Said					14								126
63	Dave Smith					13								124
64	Brad Lloyd					37					DNQ			116
65	Rick Boysal					17								112
66	Brady Flaherty										18			109
67	John Davis					19								106
68	Tim Spurgeon										20			103
69	Joe Miller											20		103
70	João Barbosa										23			94
71	Bobby Grewohl											23		94
72	Eddie MacDonald												23	94
73	David Gilliland					28*								89
74	Andrew Myers		**27**											87
75	Zach Germain												27	87
76	Bobby Hillis Jr.		30											73
77	Nick Lynch		31											70
78	Cody Cambensy												31	70
79	Jeff Barkshire												32	67
80	Derek Ramstrom		DNQ											55
81	Mattias Ekström					36								55
82	Jamie Dick												38	49
83	Keith Flach												DNQ	34
	Drew Brannon			DNQ										

== See also ==
- 2010 NASCAR Sprint Cup Series
- 2010 NASCAR Nationwide Series
- 2010 NASCAR Camping World Truck Series
- 2010 ARCA Racing Series
- 2010 NASCAR Whelen Modified Tour
- 2010 NASCAR Whelen Southern Modified Tour
- 2010 NASCAR Canadian Tire Series
- 2010 NASCAR Corona Series
- 2010 NASCAR Mini Stock Series
