= Nicole Behar =

American racing driver

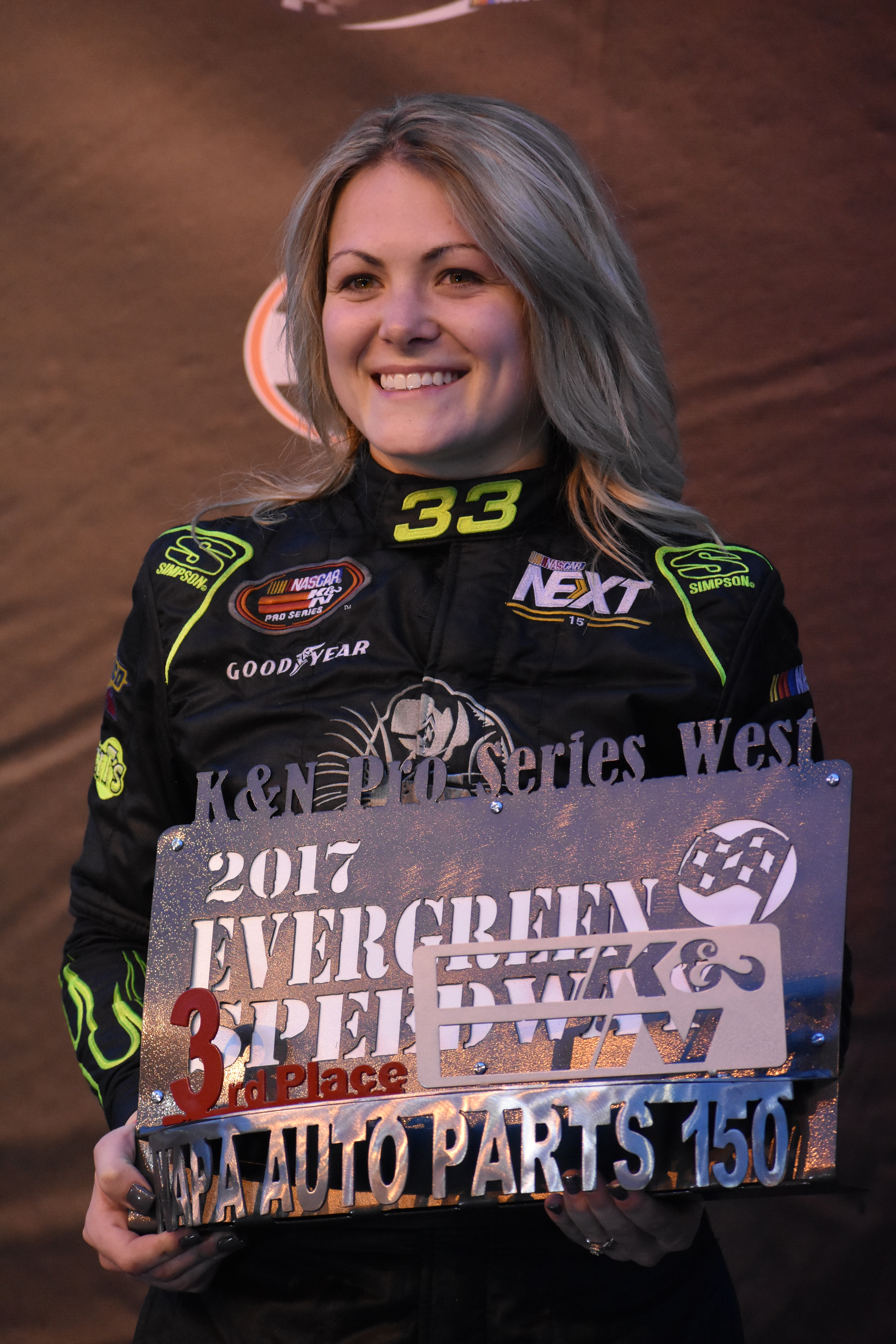
- Behar after finishing a season-high third at Evergreen Speedway in 2017
- Born: November 15, 1997 (age 28) Spokane, Washington, U.S.

K&N Pro Series West career
- Debut season: 2014
- Current team: Nicole Behar Racing
- Car number: 33
- Engine: Toyota
- Starts: 20
- Best finish: 8th in 2017

Previous series
- 2016 2016: ARCA Racing Series; CARS Super Late Model Tour

Nicole Behar (born November 15, 1997) is an American stock car racing driver. She debuted in NASCAR K&N Pro Series West competition in 2014, driving the No. 33 for her family racing team.

== Racing career ==
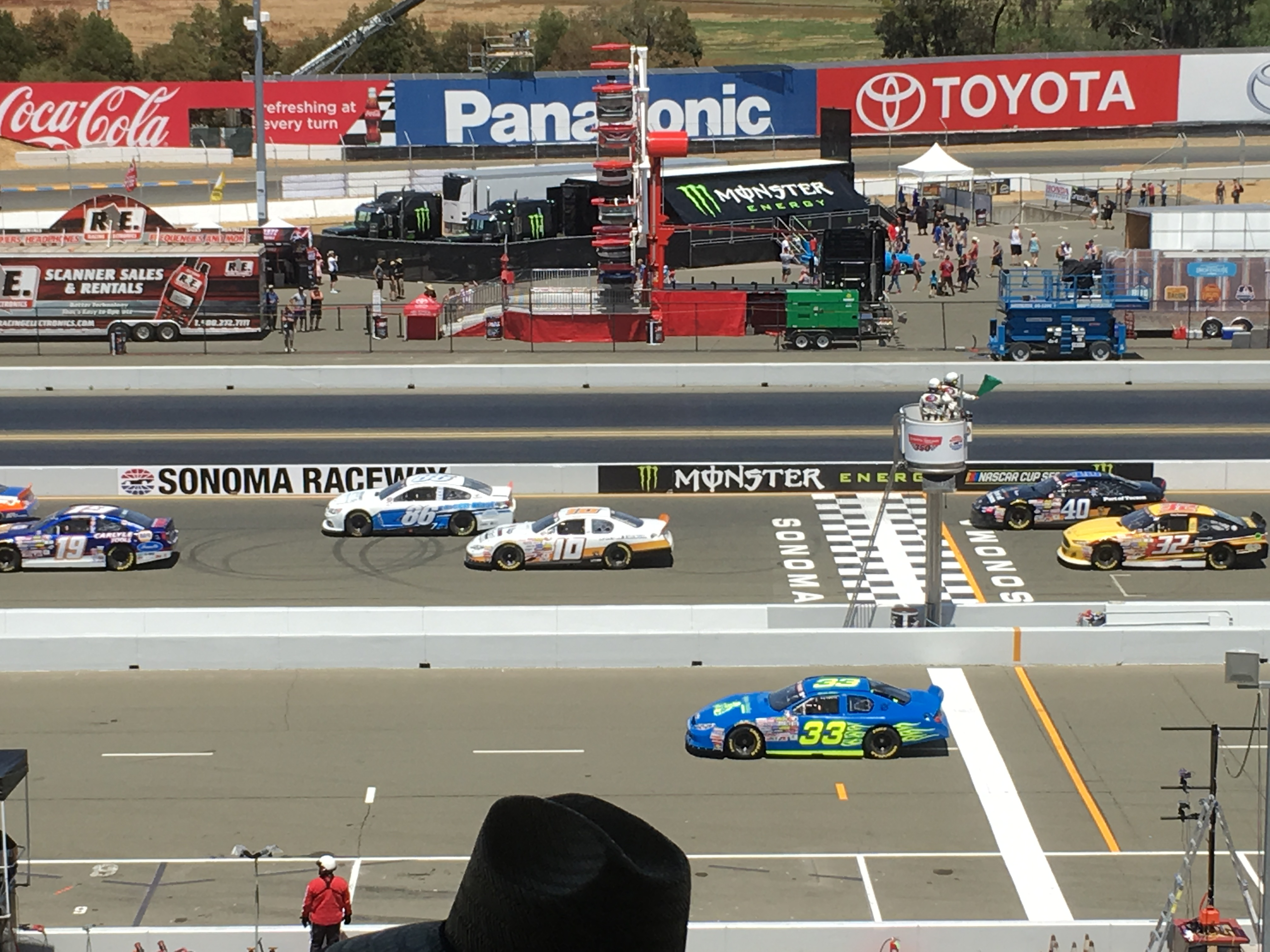
Behar (No. 33) pits during the 2017 Carneros 200 at Sonoma Raceway.

A fifth generation racer, Behar began go-kart racing after her sixth birthday, transitioning to full bodied cars at fourteen.

Behar entered the K&N Pro Series West with her family team toward the end of the 2014 season, finishing sixth (of 17 cars) in her debut race. The following season, she commanded significant attention after her second-place finish at the King Taco Catering/NAPA Auto Parts 150, earning an invitation into the NASCAR Next program for promising young drivers. Running consistently in the top half of the field, Behar finished the year with nine top-tens in thirteen races, good enough for tenth place in the final points standings. For the 2016 season, Behar signed a development deal with the better resourced David Gilliland Racing to run the CARS Super Late Model Tour, but parted ways with the outfit amid unclear circumstances after attempting and starting only one of the first three races. Undeterred, Behar started and finished third in her ARCA Racing Series debut that June at Madison International Speedway, driving a Toyota for Venturini Motorsports. Subsequently, Behar returned to the K&N Pro Series West for four starts, adding four top-ten finishes for a career total of fifteen, a record among female K&N Pro Series West drivers. At Idaho's Meridian Speedway, she finished third to Julia Landauer's second, the first time two women had run top-five in the same NASCAR touring series race since 1988.

== Personal life ==
Behar has put her college aspirations on hiatus, moving to Mooresville, North Carolina in January 2016 to be closer to the hub of stock car racing.

== Motorsports career results ==
=== NASCAR ===
(key) (Bold – Pole position awarded by qualifying time. Italics – Pole position earned by points standings or practice time. * – Most laps led.)

==== K&N Pro Series West ====
NASCAR K&N Pro Series West results
Year	Team	No.	Make	1	2	3	4	5	6	7	8	9	10	11	12	13	14	NKNPSWC	Pts
2014	Nicole Behar Racing	33	Chevy	PHO	IRW	S99	IOW	KCR	SON	SLS; 6	CNS	IOW	KCR	EVG; 17	MMP			25th	101
2014	Nicole Behar Racing	33	Toyota													AAS; 8	PHO	25th	101
2015	Nicole Behar Racing	33	Ford	KCR; 21	IRW; 2	TUS; 5												10th	424
2015	Nicole Behar Racing	33	Toyota				IOW; 9	SHA; 10	SON; 23	SLS; 7	IOW; 7	EVG; 9	CNS; 9	MER; 17	AAS; 7	PHO; 22		10th	424
2016	Nicole Behar Racing	33	Toyota	IRW	KCR	TUS	OSS	CNS	SON	SLS	IOW	EVG; 9	DCS; 10	MMP	MMP	MER; 3	AAS; 5	20th	149
2017	Nicole Behar Racing	33	Toyota	TUS; 10	KCR; 7	IRW; 4	IRW; 8	SPO; 6	OSS; 17	CNS; 17	SON; 25	IOW; 27	EVG; 3	DCS; 12	MER; 20	AAS; 6	KCR; 10	8th	444

=== ARCA Racing Series ===
ARCA Racing Series results
Year	Team	No.	Make	1	2	3	4	5	6	7	8	9	10	11	12	13	14	15	16	17	18	19	20	ARSC	Pts	Ref
2016	Venturini Motorsports	55	Toyota	DAY	NSH	SLM	TAL	TOL	NJE	POC	MCH	MAD; 3	WIN	IOW	IRP	POC	BLN	ISF	DSF	SLM	CHI	KEN	KAN	88th	215	

=== CARS Super Late Model Tour ===
(key)

CARS Super Late Model Tour results
Year	Team	No.	Make	1	2	3	4	5	6	7	8	9	10	CSLMTC	Pts	Ref
2016	David Gilliland Racing	97	Toyota	SNM; 14	ROU	HCY; 23	TCM	GRE	ROU	CON	MYB	HCY	SNM	53rd	20	
