= Joey Licata =

American racing driver

- Born: July 31, 1991 (age 35); Van Nuys, California, U.S.

ARCA Menards Series career
- 2 races run over 1 year
- Best finish: 6th (2011)
- First race: 2011 Lucas Oil Slick Mist 200 (Daytona)
- Last race: 2011 3 Amigos 250 (Talladega)
Wins	Top tens	Poles
0	1	0

ARCA Menards Series West career
- 2 races run over 1 year
- Best finish: 38th (2014)
- First race: 2014 Stockton 150 (Stockton)
- Last race: 2014 Toyota / NAPA Auto Parts 150 (Roseville)
Wins	Top tens	Poles
0	1	0
- Statistics up to date as of November 21, 2024.

Joey Licata Jr. (born July 31, 1991) is an American former professional stock car racing driver who has competed in the NASCAR K&N Pro Series West and the ARCA Racing Series.

Licata has also previously competed in the ASA Truck Series, where he won the championship in 2009 and 2010.

== Motorsports results ==
=== NASCAR ===
(key) (Bold - Pole position awarded by qualifying time. Italics - Pole position earned by points standings or practice time. * – Most laps led.)

==== K&N Pro Series West ====
NASCAR K&N Pro Series West results
Year	Team	No.	Make	1	2	3	4	5	6	7	8	9	10	11	12	13	14	NKNPSWC	Pts	Ref
2014	Jason Houghtaling	33	Ford	PHO	IRW	S99; 19	IOW	KCR	SON	SLS	CNS	IOW	EVG	KCR	MMP			38th	63	
2014	Kevin McCarty	36	Toyota													AAS; 6	PHO	38th	63	

=== ARCA Racing Series ===
(key) (Bold – Pole position awarded by qualifying time. Italics – Pole position earned by points standings or practice time. * – Most laps led.)

ARCA Racing Series results
Year	Team	No.	Make	1	2	3	4	5	6	7	8	9	10	11	12	13	14	15	16	17	18	19	ARSC	Pts	Ref
2011	Cunningham Motorsports	77	Dodge	DAY; 6	TAL; 37	SLM	TOL	NJE	CHI	POC	MCH	WIN	BLN	IOW	IRP	POC	ISF	MAD	DSF	SLM	KAN	TOL	79th	245	
