= 2014 NASCAR K&N Pro Series West =

NASCAR season

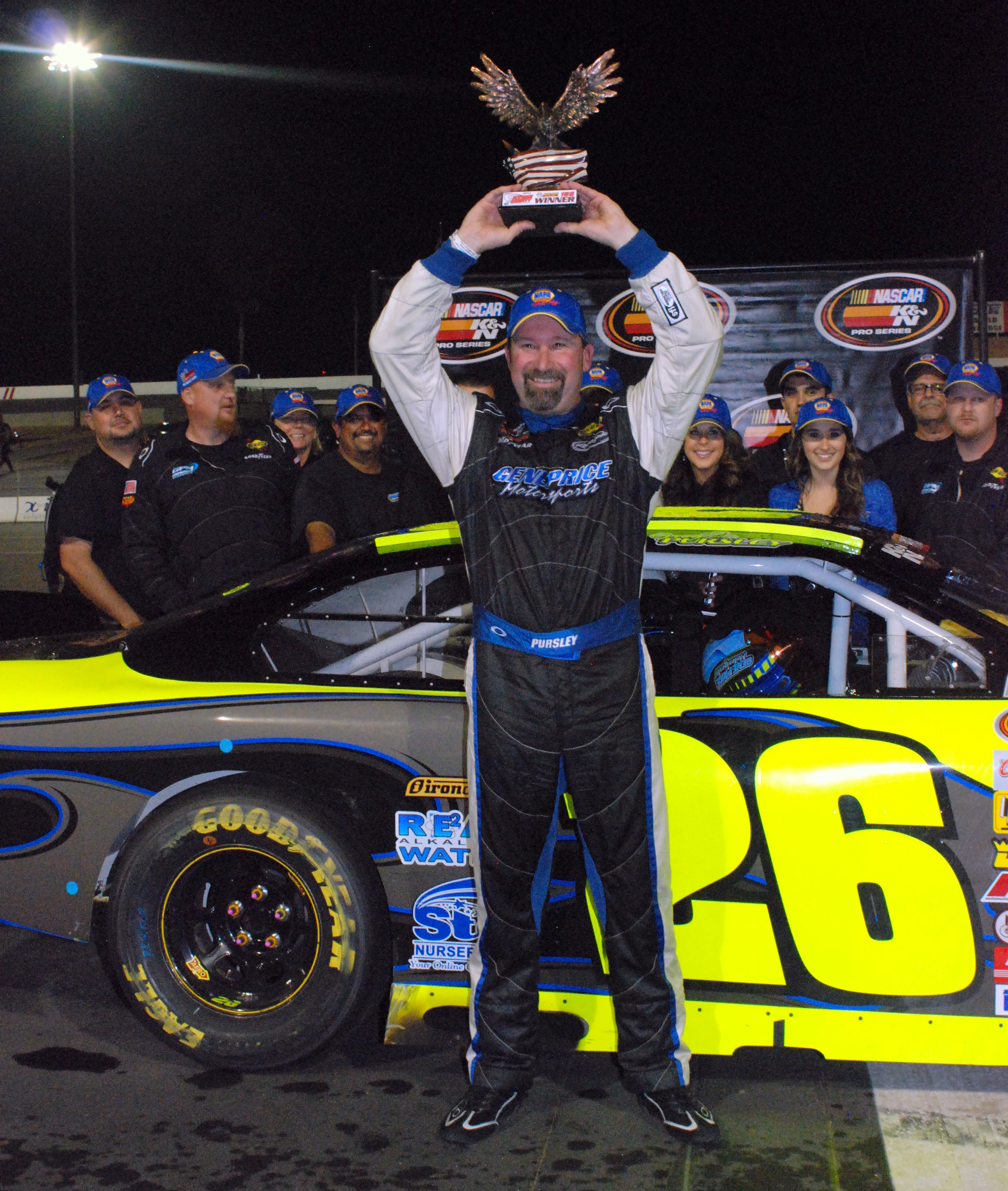
Greg Pursley, the 2014 K&N Pro Series West champion. He won the title, his second in the series, in his last full season before retiring.

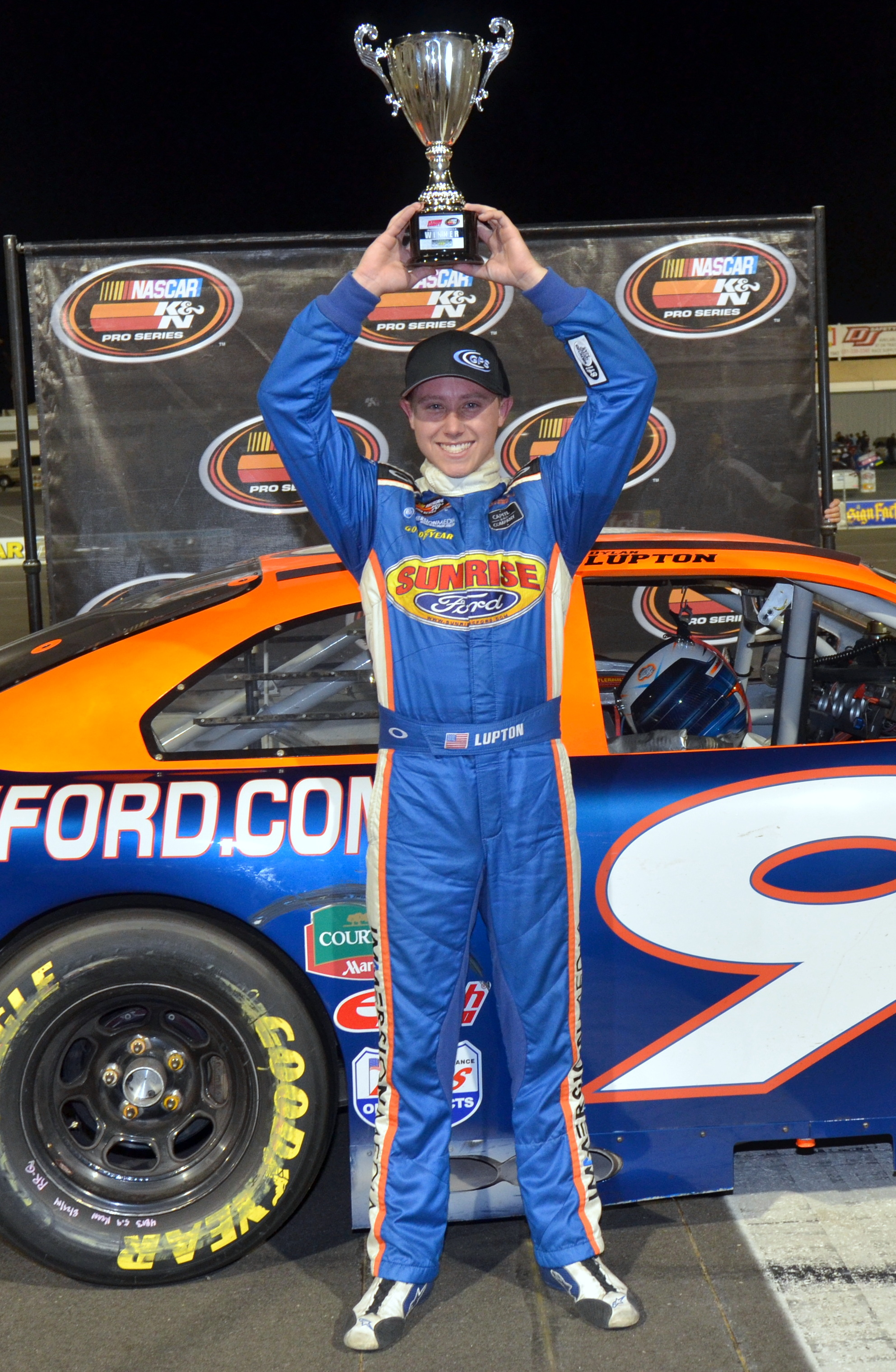
Dylan Lupton finished second behind Pursley in the championship by 17 points.

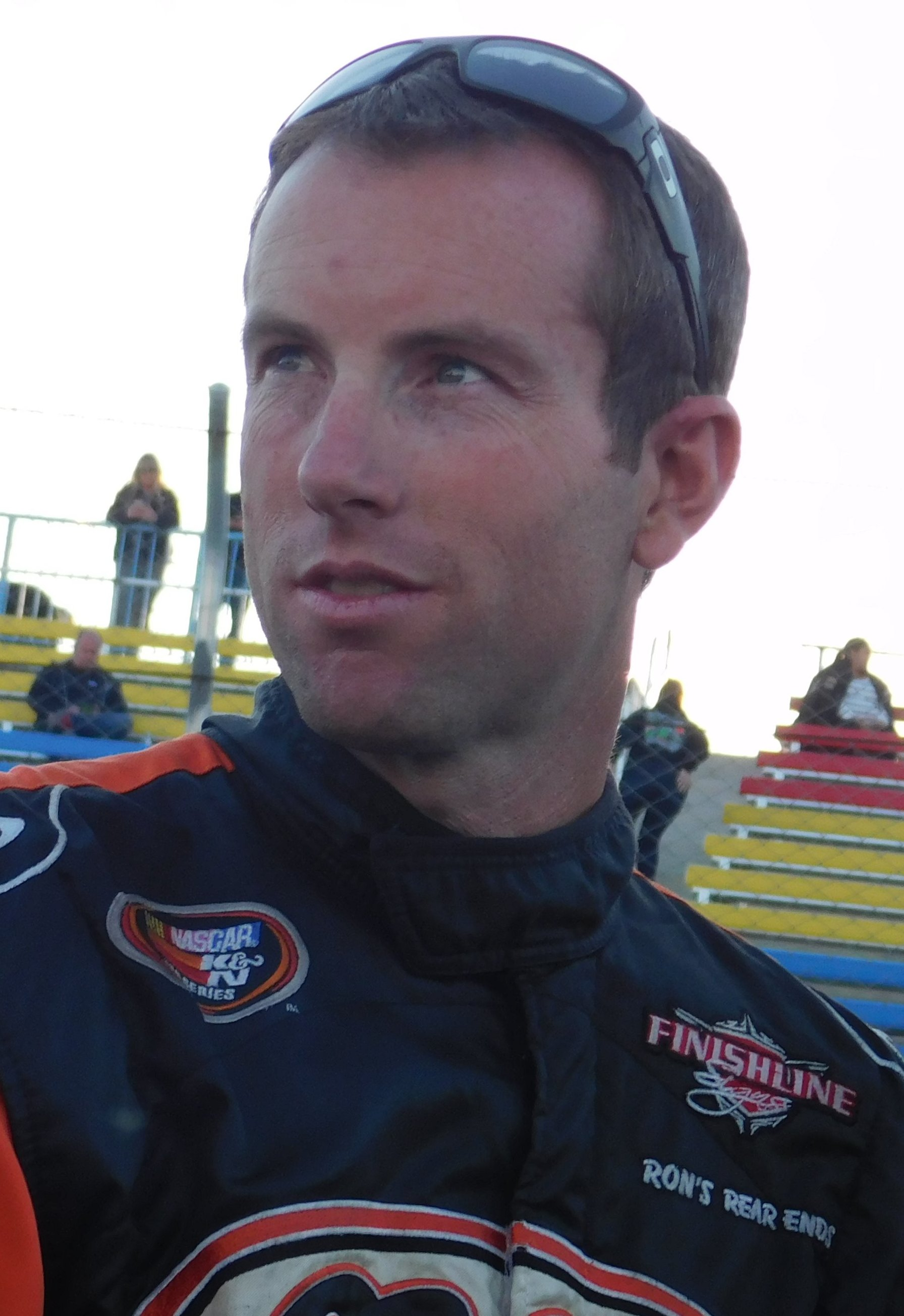
David Mayhew finished third in the championship.

The 2014 NASCAR K&N Pro Series West was the 61st season of the K&N Pro Series West. It began with the Talking Stick Resort 75 at Phoenix International Raceway on February 27, and ended with the Casino Arizona 100, also at Phoenix, on November 6. Derek Thorn entered the season as the defending Drivers' Champion. 2011 champion Greg Pursley won his second championship after the last race, 17 points ahead of Dylan Lupton.

This season was also notable for featuring the debut of James Bickford, the cousin of NASCAR legend Jeff Gordon. Driving the No. 6 car for Sunrise Ford Racing, Bickford went on to win rookie of the year for the season.

== Drivers ==
No.	Manufacturer	Car Owner	Race Driver	Crew Chief
00	Toyota 1	Bill McAnally	Cole Custer 2	TBA
00	Chevrolet 1	Bill McAnally	Cole Custer 2	TBA
1	Chevrolet 1	Valerie Inglebright	Jim Inglebright 1	TBA
1	Toyota 1	Bill McAnally	Michael Waltrip 1	TBA
02	Chevrolet	Bob Newberry	Gray Gaulding 1	TBA
2	Chevrolet	Carl Harr	Carl Harr 2	Bernie Klingenberg
2	Chevrolet	Carl Harr	Phyl Zubizareta (R) 2 (Note: At the Casey's General Store 150 at Iowa, a number of drivers drove with different numbers than normal: Phyl Zubizareta drove car number 38, instead of his regular car number 2, while Thomas Martin drove car number 11, instead of his regular car number 5. James Bickford drove car number 66, instead of his regular car number 6, and Jack Sellers drove car number 5, instead of his regular car number 15.)	Bernie Klingenberg
2	Chevrolet	Carl Harr	Brady Flaherty 1	Bernie Klingenberg
2	Chevrolet	Carl Harr	James Cooley (R) 1	Bernie Klingenberg
5	Chevrolet	Charlie Silva	Thomas Martin 12	Jacob Koens
5	Chevrolet	Charlie Silva	Anthony Garbarino (R) 1	Jacob Koens
6	Ford	Bob Bruncati	James Bickford (R) (Note: At the Autolite Iridium XP 150 at Iowa, two drivers drove with different numbers than normal: James Bickford drove car number 66, instead of his regular car number 6, and Justin Funkhouser drove car number 51, instead of his regular car number 15.)	Bill Sedgwick
07	Chevrolet	Greg Rayl	Cameron Millard 1 (R)	Robert Fulks
07	Chevrolet	Greg Rayl	Greg Rayl 2	Robert Fulks
7	Toyota	Bill McAnally	Gracin Raz 1	N/A
8	Chevrolet	Bill Hall	Johnny Borneman III 2	TBA
09	Dodge 2	Dick Midgley	Jason Fraser (R) 1	TBA
09	Dodge 2	Dick Midgley	Darrell Midgley (R) 1	TBA
09	Chevrolet 1	Dick Midgley	Tyler Tanner (R) 1	TBA
9	Ford	Bob Bruncati	Dylan Lupton	Jeff Schrader
10	Chevrolet	Larry Collie	Austin Cameron 2	TBA
11	Chevrolet	Jack Sellers	Thomas Martin 2 (Note: Thomas Martin drove with car number 11, but at the 5th race, the Armed Forces 150, he drove for car number 5 owners points.)	Jacob Koens
11	Chevrolet	Jack Sellers	Michael Shawhan (R) 1	Jacob Koens
11	Chevrolet	Jack Sellers	Justin Funkhouser 3	Jacob Koens
11	Chevrolet	Jack Sellers	Jack Sellers 3	Jacob Koens
11	Chevrolet	Jack Sellers	Anthony Garbarino (R) 1	Jacob Koens
12	Toyota 6	Giles Thornton	Giles Thornton 7	Travis Sharpe
12	Ford 1	Giles Thornton	Giles Thornton 7	Travis Sharpe
13	Chevrolet	Kelly Souza	Todd Souza 2	Gil Munoz
14	Toyota8	Bob Wood	Griffin Steinfeld (R) 2	Zack Huffman
14	Toyota8	Bob Wood	Zack Huffman 2	Zack Huffman
14	Toyota8	Bob Wood	John Wood 1	Zack Huffman
14	Toyota8	Bob Wood	Anthony Garbarino (R) 1	Zack Huffman
14	Toyota8	Bob Wood	Rich DeLong Jr. (R) 2	Zack Huffman
14	Chevrolet 1	Bob Wood	Rich DeLong Jr. (R) 1	Zack Huffman
14	Chevrolet 1	Bob Wood	Justin Haley (R) 1	Zack Huffman
14	Ford 1	Bob Wood	Zack Huffman 1	Zack Huffman
15	Chevrolet	Jack Sellers	Jack Sellers 11	Randy Lathrop
15	Chevrolet	Jack Sellers	Justin Funkhouser 3	Randy Lathrop
16	Toyota	Bill McAnally	Brandon McReynolds	Jeff Jefferson
17	Chevrolet	Steve McGowan	David Mayhew	Steve Portenga
18	Toyota	Becky Kann	Bill Kann (R) 6	TBA
20	Chevrolet	Bob Newberry	Gray Gaulding 1	TBA
21	Chevrolet	Steve Portenga	Austin Dillon 1	Jeff Jefferson
21	Chevrolet	Steve Portenga	Alex Schutte (R) 1	Jeff Jefferson
21	Chevrolet	Steve Portenga	Jay Beasley (R) 1	Jeff Jefferson
22	Ford	Bryan Hill	Austin Hill (R) 1	TBA
24	Chevrolet	Bob Newberry	Brennan Newberry 1	TBA
25	Chevrolet 1	Sharon Naake	Tom Klauer 1	Mike Naake
25	Toyota 1	Mike Naake	Chris Eggleston 1	TBA
26	Chevrolet 1	Gene Price	Greg Pursley	Jerry Pitts
26	Ford 13	Gene Price	Greg Pursley	Jerry Pitts
27	Ford	Steven Benjamin	Kyle Benjamin (R) 1	TBA
30	Toyota	Nick Sommers	John Wood 12	Mike Holleran
30	Toyota	Nick Sommers	Luis Tyrrell (R) 1	Mike Holleran
30	Toyota	Nick Sommers	Zack Huffman 1	Mike Holleran
31	Chevrolet	Windi Portenga	Michael Annett 1	TBA
33	Ford 1	Jason Houghtaling	Joey Licata (R) 1	TBA
33	Chevrolet2	Mike Behar	Nicole Behar (R) 2	TBA
33	Toyota 2	Mike Behar	Nicole Behar (R) 1	TBA
33	Toyota 2	Mike Behar	Jamie Krzysik (R) 1	TBA
35	Chevrolet	Lyz Kann	J. D. White (R) 2	TBA
36	Toyota	Kevin McCarty	Jamie Krzysik (R) 1	TBA
36	Toyota	Kevin McCarty	Josh Burdon (R) 1	TBA
36	Toyota	Kevin McCarty	John Wood 1	TBA
36	Toyota	Kevin McCarty	Christopher Wahl (R) 1	TBA
36	Toyota	Kevin McCarty	Dave Smith 2	TBA
36	Toyota	Kevin McCarty	Charlie Wahl (R) 1	TBA
36	Toyota	Kevin McCarty	Jack Nugent (R) 1	TBA
36	Toyota	Kevin McCarty	Jairo Avila Jr. (R) 2	TBA
36	Toyota	Kevin McCarty	Dan Moore (R) 1	TBA
36	Toyota	Kevin McCarty	Joey Licata (R) 1	TBA
36	Toyota	Kevin McCarty	Hannah Newhouse (R) 1	TBA
38	Toyota9	Mike Holleran	Jack Chisholm (R) 2	TBA
38	Toyota9	Mike Holleran	Andrew Porter (R) 1	TBA
38	Toyota9	Mike Holleran	Tyler Monroe (R) 2	TBA
38	Toyota9	Mike Holleran	Zack Huffman 3	TBA
38	Toyota9	Mike Holleran	Jairo Avila Jr. (R) 1	TBA
38	Chevrolet 4	Mike Holleran	Jairo Avila Jr. (R) 1	TBA
38	Chevrolet 4	Mike Holleran	Zack Huffman 1	TBA
38	Chevrolet 4	Mike Holleran	Dave Smith 1	TBA
38	Chevrolet 4	Mike Holleran	Wendell Chavous (R) 1	TBA
39	Toyota	Bob Wood	Jairo Avila Jr. (R) 1	TBA
41	Chevrolet	Robert Dixon	Jamie Krzysik (R) 1	TBA
41	Chevrolet	Robert Dixon	Matt Tifft 1	TBA
42	Dodge 2	Danny Cuzick	Taylor Cuzick 6	Christopher Wahl
42	Ford 4	Danny Cuzick	Taylor Cuzick 6	Christopher Wahl
42	Chevrolet 2	Steve Turner	Kyle Larson 1	TBA
42	Chevrolet 2	Danny Cuzick	Taylor Cuzick 1	Christopher Wahl
44	Toyota	Dave Reed	Austin Reed (R) 2	TBA
47	Toyota	Michelle Ivie	Scott Ivie 4	William Loe
51	Chevrolet	Carlos Vieira	Carlos Vieira 5	Mario Isola
54	Toyota	Michael Giannone	Anthony Giannone 10	Michael Munoz
54	Toyota	Michael Giannone	Zack Huffman 1	Michael Munoz
55	Toyota	Bill McAnally	Nick Drake (R) 1	TBA
61	Chevrolet	Richard Thompson	Brett Thompson 5	Will Harris
71	Chevrolet	Daryl Harr	Daryl Harr 2	Mike Brown
74	Chevrolet	Thomas Tyrrell	Luis Tyrrell (R) 5	Jason Houghtaling
77	Toyota	Kevin McCarty	Ryan Partridge (R) 1	TBA
81	Dodge	Dwight Kennedy	D. J. Kennington 2	TBA
82	Chevrolet	Todd Havens	Braeden Havens 3	TBA
83	Chevrolet	Menno Admiraal	Kelly Admiraal (R) 4	Craig Raudman
83	Chevrolet	Menno Admiraal	Justin Allgaier 1	Craig Raudman
84	Chevrolet	Richard DeLong	Rich DeLong III (R)	Phil Gold
86	Toyota 2	Tim Spurgeon	Jacob Gomes 1	Mike David
86	Toyota 2	Tim Spurgeon	Tim Spurgeon (R) 1	Mike David
86	Chevrolet 1	Tim Spurgeon	Jacob Gomes 1	Mike David
88	Ford2	Mike Naake	Jessica Brunelli (R) 1	TBA
88	Ford2	Mike Naake	Jeremy Doss (R) 1	TBA
88	Chevrolet 1	Mike Naake	Jessica Brunelli (R) 1	TBA
97	Chevrolet	Jason Little	Jesse Little 3	TBA
99	Toyota 6	Bill McAnally	Patrick Staropoli (R) 2	TBA
99	Toyota 6	Bill McAnally	Chris Eggleston 2	TBA
99	Toyota 6	Bill McAnally	Gracin Raz (R) 1	TBA
99	Toyota 6	Bill McAnally	Christian PaHud (R) 1	TBA
99	Toyota 6	Bill McAnally	Nick Drake (R) 1	TBA
99	Ford 1	Bill McAnally	Ricky Stenhouse Jr. 1	TBA

== Schedule ==
No.	Race title	Track	Date
1	Talking Stick Resort 75	Phoenix International Raceway, Avondale, Arizona	February 27
2	NAPA Auto Parts 150	Irwindale Speedway, Irwindale, California	March 22
3	Stockton 150	Stockton 99 Speedway, Stockton, California	May 3
4	Casey's General Store 150 (Note: The Casey's General Store 150 was held as a combined event, with competitors from the K&N Pro Series West competing along with competitors for the K&N Pro Series East. The race was run with a series-based point distribution, where drivers received points and statistical credit for their finish relative to other drivers in their series, not to the whole field in general.)	Iowa Speedway, Newton, Iowa	May 17
5	Armed Forces 150	Kern County Raceway Park, Bakersfield, California	May 24
6	Carneros 200	Sonoma Raceway, Sonoma, California	June 21
7	NAPA Auto Parts/Toyota 150	Stateline Speedway, Post Falls, Idaho	July 12
8	NAPA Auto Parts/Toyota 150	Colorado National Speedway, Erie, Colorado	July 26
9	Autolite Iridium XP 150 (Note: The Autolite Iridium XP 150 was held as a combined event, with competitors from the K&N Pro Series West competing along with competitors for the K&N Pro Series East. The race was run with a series-based point distribution, where drivers received points and statistical credit for their finish relative to other drivers in their series, not to the whole field in general.)	Iowa Speedway, Newton, Iowa	August 1
10	NAPA Auto Parts/Toyota 150	Evergreen Speedway, Monroe, Washington	August 16
11	Bakersfield 150	Kern County Raceway Park, Bakersfield, California	August 30
12	Utah Grand Prix	Miller Motorsports Park, Tooele, Utah	September 13
13	Toyota/NAPA Auto Parts 150	All American Speedway, Roseville, California	October 11
14	Casino Arizona 100	Phoenix International Raceway, Avondale, Arizona	November 6

== Results and standings ==
=== Races ===
No.	Race	Pole position	Most laps led	Winning driver	Manufacturer
1	Talking Stick Resort 75	Cole Custer	Cole Custer	Cole Custer	Chevrolet
2	NAPA Auto Parts 150	Brandon McReynolds	Brett Thompson	Patrick Staropoli	Toyota
3	Stockton 150	David Mayhew	David Mayhew	David Mayhew	Chevrolet
4	Casey's General Store 150	Patrick Staropoli	Ben Rhodes	David Mayhew	Chevrolet
5	Armed Forces 150	Greg Pursley	Greg Pursley	Greg Pursley	Ford
6	Carneros 200	Kyle Larson	Kyle Larson	Kyle Larson	Chevrolet
7	NAPA Auto Parts/Toyota 150	Braeden Havens	David Mayhew	James Bickford	Ford
8	NAPA Auto Parts/Toyota 150	David Mayhew	Chris Eggleston	Chris Eggleston	Toyota
9	Autolite Iridium XP 150	David Mayhew	Cole Custer	Greg Pursley	Ford
10	NAPA Auto Parts/Toyota 150	Brandon McReynolds	Dylan Lupton	David Mayhew	Chevrolet
11	Bakersfield 150	Greg Pursley	Greg Pursley	Dylan Lupton	Ford
12	Utah Grand Prix	Greg Pursley	Greg Pursley	David Mayhew	Chevrolet
13	Toyota/NAPA Auto Parts 150	Christian PaHud	Christian PaHud	Christian PaHud	Toyota
14	Casino Arizona 100	Nick Drake	Nick Drake	Nick Drake	Toyota

=== Drivers' championship ===
(key) Bold - Pole position awarded by time. Italics - Pole position set by final practice results or rainout. * – Most laps led.

Pos	Driver	PHO	IRW	S99	IOW	KER	SON	SLN	CNS	IOW	EVG	KER	MMP	AAS	PHO	Points
1	Greg Pursley	4	3	2	12	**1***	2	2	4	9	11	**9***	**4***	4	9	577
2	Dylan Lupton	6	5	6	20	2	3	8	2	27	3*	1	2	9	5	560
3	David Mayhew	24	2	**1***	9	3	21	5*	**14**	10	1	10	1	5	6	540
4	Brandon McReynolds	8	**4**	4	34	4	5	3	5	14	**2**	2	5	3	20	538
5	James Bickford **(R)**	25	15	10	17	6	24	1	3	18	4	4	3	2	30	526
6	Thomas Martin	14	14	5	22	16	19	9	6	28	8	5	14	17	12	463
7	John Wood	18	16	11	30	17	18	13	9	36	15	12	15	12	25	412
8	Rich DeLong III **(R)**	17	21	17	37	12	20	14	12	38	14	15	13	19	17	397
9	Jack Sellers	26	22	16	28	19	26	15	11	37	12	13	19	21	31	363
10	Anthony Giannone	20	23	8	23	9	28	11	13	42	18					288
11	Zack Huffman			12		11	DNQ^{2}			41	13	11	9	13	32	251
12	Taylor Cuzick	10	9	7	26							6	7		11	249
13	Giles Thornton	7	6	3	29	7					5				24	245
14	Justin Funkhouser							17	15	31	19	7			18	179
15	Brett Thompson	9	7*						7				6		19	174
16	Jairo Avila Jr. **(R)**							7	10	35	16	8				169
17	Bill Kann **(R)**	21				14	29		8				10		13	169
18	Carlos Vieira	12	10				15					18		11		154
19	Kelly Admiraal **(R)**	19								26		14			14	123
20	Cole Custer	**1***			13^{1}		12			3*^{1}					3	121
21	Jesse Little				21^{1}	5				**12**^{1}		3			4	121
22	Luis Tyrrell **(R)**	11	11	18	24	18								18		121
23	Scott Ivie		20			15	17						11			113
24	Chris Eggleston								1*	25					22	109
25	Nicole Behar **(R)**							6			17			8		101
26	Jamie Krzysik **(R)**	13				8									10	101
27	Braeden Havens							**4**			DNQ^{2}			14		94
28	Nick Drake **(R)**	3			2^{1}					16^{1}					**1***	89
29	Patrick Staropoli **(R)**		1		15											88
30	Rich DeLong Jr. **(R)**								16			16	20			80
31	D. J. Kennington	5													7	76
32	Gracin Raz **(R)**										6			7		75
33	Johnny Borneman III						7								8	73
34	Dave Smith						27						18	15		72
35	Anthony Garbarino **(R)**						23						16	22		71
36	Tyler Monroe **(R)**			9		13										66
37	Todd Souza						11						12			65
38	Joey Licata **(R)**			19										6		63
39	Austin Reed **(R)**										10				16	62
40	Gray Gaulding	29			25^{1}					13^{1}					2	57
41	Jessica Brunelli **(R)**		18	13												57
42	Carl Harr	16	19													53
43	Austin Cameron						DNQ^{2}						8			49
44	Jack Chisholm **(R)**	27						12								49
45	Griffin Steinfeld **(R)**	22	17													49
46	Kyle Larson						**1***									48
47	Christian PaHud **(R)**													**1***		48
48	Daryl Harr	28	12													48
49	Jacob Gomes		25											20		43
50	Brennan Newberry	2			6^{1}					39^{1}						42
51	Ricky Stenhouse Jr.						4									40
52	Greg Rayl	23	26													39
53	Michael Annett						6									38
54	Tyler Tanner **(R)**										7					37
55	Ryan Partridge **(R)**		8													37
56	Jim Inglebright						8									36
57	J. D. White **(R)**		24												28	36
58	Tom Klauer						9									35
59	Dan Moore **(R)**										9					35
60	Christopher Wahl **(R)**					10										34
61	Matt Tifft						10									34
62	Darrell Midgley **(R)**							10								34
63	Michael Waltrip													10		34
64	Andrew Porter **(R)**		13													31
65	Phyl Zubizareta **(R)**			DNQ	31											31
66	Tim Spurgeon **(R)**						13									31
67	Josh Burdon **(R)**			14												30
68	Justin Allgaier						14									30
69	Jason Fraser **(R)**	15														29
70	Cameron Millard **(R)**			15												29
71	Austin Hill **(R)**				10^{1}					34^{1}					15	29
72	Brady Flaherty						16									28
73	Charlie Wahl **(R)**							16								28
74	Alex Schutte **(R)**													16		28
75	Jack Nugent **(R)**								17							27
76	Jeremy Doss **(R)**											17				27
77	James Cooley **(R)**												17			27
78	Wendell Chavous **(R)**														21	23
79	Austin Dillon						22									22
80	Hannah Newhouse **(R)**														23	21
81	Michael Shawhan **(R)**						25									19
82	Justin Haley **(R)**									24^{1}					26	18
83	Kyle Benjamin **(R)**									17^{1}					27	17
84	Jay Beasley **(R)**				4^{1}					29^{1}					29	15
Drivers ineligible for K&N Pro Series West points
	Brandon Jones				5					1						
	Ben Rhodes **(R)**				1*					7						
	Kenzie Ruston				16					2						
	Scott Heckert				3					5						
	Sergio Peña				11					4						
	Eddie MacDonald				35					6						
	Daniel Suárez				7					11						
	Ronnie Bassett Jr. **(R)**				8					22						
	Kaz Grala **(R)**				36					8						
	Cameron Hayley				14					19						
	Brodie Kostecki **(R)**				**33**					15						
	Trey Hutchens **(R)**				18					20						
	Ryan Gifford				19					40						
	Ross Chastain									21						
	Mackena Bell				32					23						
	David Garbo Jr. **(R)**				27											
	Akinori Ogata									30						
	Cale Conley									32						
	Zachary Bruenger **(R)**									33						
	Anderson Bowen									43						
	Chad Finley **(R)**									DNQ						
Pos	Driver	PHO	IRW	S99	IOW	KER	SON	SLN	CNS	IOW	EVG	KER	MMP	AAS	PHO	Points

Notes

- ^{1} – Scored points towards the K&N Pro Series East.
- ^{2} – Zack Huffman, Austin Cameron and Braeden Havens received championship points, despite the fact that they did not qualify for the race.

== See also ==
- 2014 NASCAR Sprint Cup Series
- 2014 NASCAR Nationwide Series
- 2014 NASCAR Camping World Truck Series
- 2014 NASCAR K&N Pro Series East
- 2014 NASCAR Whelen Modified Tour
- 2014 NASCAR Whelen Southern Modified Tour
- 2014 NASCAR Canadian Tire Series
- 2014 NASCAR Toyota Series
- 2014 NASCAR Whelen Euro Series
