= Thomas Martin (racing driver) =

American racing driver (born 1978)

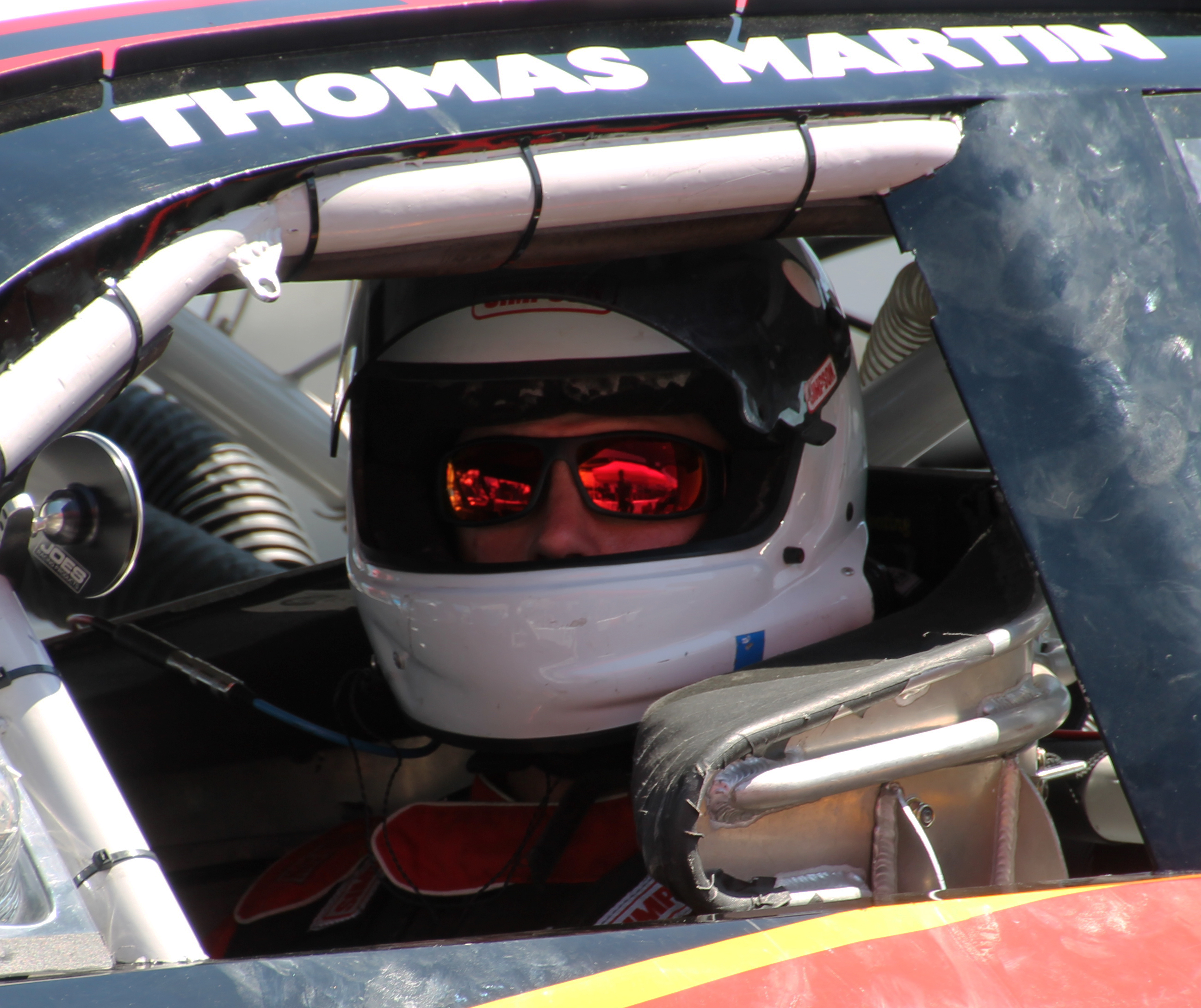
- Martin at the 2015 Carneros 200 at Sonoma Raceway
- Nationality: (United States) American
- Born: June 4, 1978 (age 48) Auburn, California, U.S.

NASCAR K&N Pro Series West career
- Debut season: 2006
- Former teams: John Martin; Charles Silva; Jack Sellers
- Starts: 34
- Championships: 0
- Wins: 0
- Poles: 0
- Best finish: 6th in 2014
- Finished last season: 24

Previous series
- 1994–1998 2001–2006 2011: Pro-Four West Coast Series; SRL Southwest Tour; K&N Pro Series East; North State Modified Series; Pacific Challenge Series

Championship titles
- 1996: Pro-Four West Coast Series Champion

Awards
- 1995 2014: Pro-Four West Coast Series Rookie of the Year; Coca Cola Move of the Year
- Statistics up to date as of July 1, 2015.

Thomas Martin (born June 4, 1978) is an American stock car racing driver. He last competed part-time in the NASCAR K&N Pro Series West, driving the No. 11 Chevrolet SS owned by John Krebs.

== Racing career ==
Martin's father was a Toyota mechanic. He owned mini stock cars. This triggered Martin's interest in racing. He made his racing debut at age 16 at the Grass Valley Speedway. His father served as his crew chief. He joined the Pro-Four West Coast Series in 1994 until 1998. In 1995, he was named rookie of the year, and in 1996, he won the championship. At Altamont Raceway Park, Martin holds the 1-lap qualifying record for the series.

Martin started racing late model cars in 1999, debuting at Madera Speedway. In 2003, he participated in the SRL Southwest Tour driving the No. 21 2002 Chevrolet Monte Carlo for Frederick W. Penney.

Martin made his K&N Pro Series West debut at Sonoma Raceway in the Carneros 200 in 2006. He finished sixth in the 2014 series. That year, he was awarded the Coca-Cola Move of the Year trophy.

== Personal life ==
Martin is from Auburn, California. He attended Placer High School, where he played football. He is a CNC machinist.
