= Havasu 95 Speedway =

Racetrack

- Location: 7 miles (11 km) SE of Lake Havasu City, Arizona
- Coordinates: 34.446°N 114.249°W
- Capacity: 4,100
- Owner: Bill Rozhon
- Opened: 1989
- Website: http://www.havasu95speedway.com/

Oval
- Surface: Asphalt
- Length: 0.16 mi (0.25 km)
- Turns: 4
- Banking: Turns, 10 degrees; straights, 2°

Havasu 95 Speedway is a 0.25-mile (0.40 km) paved oval racing circuit located in Lake Havasu City, Arizona.

The track primarily hosts weekly stock car events. Classes that run at the track include late models, modifieds, trucks, street stocks, legends, bandoleros, and factory stocks. It is one of three paved ovals in the state of Arizona, and the only one in western Arizona.

The track hosted its first NASCAR touring series event, a K&N Pro Series West race, in 2012. It held a Lucas Oil Modified Series race in 2015.
