= Sandia Speedway =

Multiple use racing facility located in USA

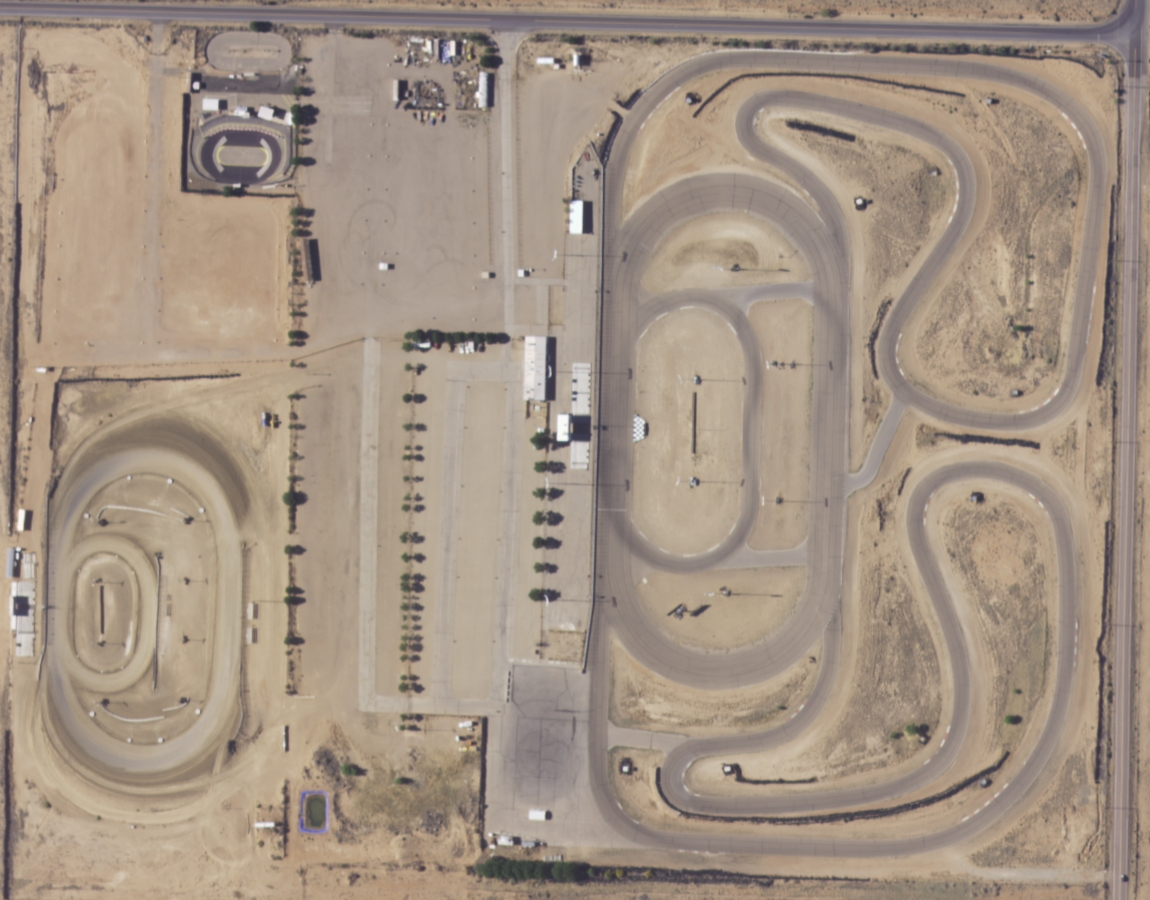
- 2022 aerial photo
- Location: Albuquerque, New Mexico, USA
- Coordinates: 35.020°N 106.858°W

Road (Full)
- Surface: Asphalt
- Length: 1.7 miles (2.7 km)
- Turns: 13
- Banking: 0°

Road (Part)
- Surface: Asphalt
- Length: 1.1 miles (1.77 km)
- Turns: 7
- Banking: 0°

Suika Circuit (formerly known as Sandia Speedway, Sandia Motorsport Park and NAPA Speedway) is a multiple use racing facility located in Albuquerque, New Mexico, USA. The complex provides two short ovals, a multiple configuration 1.7 mile road course, Kart racing ovals, a 3/8 Mile Dirt Oval, and a large skid pad.

The track was recently purchased in January 2023 from the previous owners and board of directors by Jim Guthrie (owner of Car Crafters), Dan Brockett (owner of Whiskey Garage) and Mike Ossell (owner of Larimer St. Garage).

They ran two NASCAR K&N Pro Series West races between 2012 and 2013. And also hosted one NASCAR Southwest Series event in 2000. Suika (formerly Sandia) is currently and has been the host of the No Coast Drift Party since 2011, one of the southwests largest drift events.

== Facilities ==
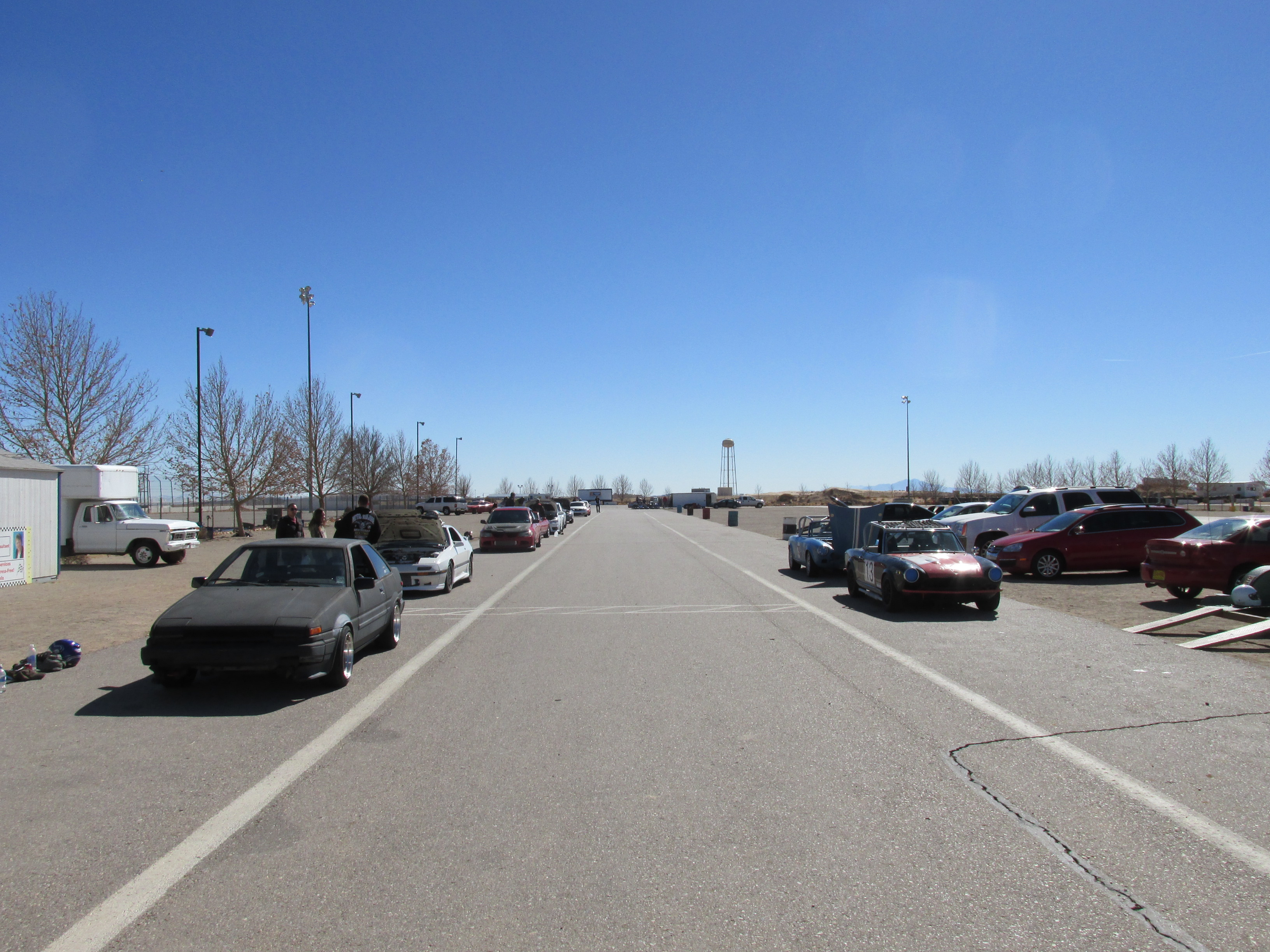
Pit area

=== Short Tracks ===
Both the 1/2 mile oval, and a smaller 1/4 mile oval are integrated with the main 1.7 mile road course.

=== Karting Ovals/Circuits ===
There are small karting ovals located in the complex.

=== Clay Oval ===
There is a 3/8 mile high banked dirt oval that includes many classes of dirt racing almost every night during the season.

=== Road Courses ===
Several possible configurations exist of the main racetrack, two of which are considered standard for roadracing use. The main racetrack is 1.7 miles in length, with 13 turns in total. All turns and straights on the course are flat. Some sanctioning bodies, such as the SCCA, use the shorter, 1.1 mile configuration for safety purposes. Any configuration may be used for drift racing.
