= Qlispé Raceway Park =

Motorsport facility in Airway Heights, Washington, U.S.

- Location: Airway Heights, Washington
- Coordinates: 47°39′36″N 117°34′23″W
- Owner: Kalispel Tribe (May 2021–present)
- Address: 750 N Hayford Rd
- Opened: 1974
- Former names: Spokane County Raceway
- Major events: Former: NASCAR K&N Pro Series West (2011, 2013, 2017)
- Website: www.qrpracing.com

Oval
- Surface: Asphalt
- Length: 0.805 km (0.500 mi)

Road Course
- Surface: Asphalt
- Length: 3.701 km (2.300 mi)

Drag Strip
- Surface: Concrete / asphalt
- Length: 0.402 km (0.250 mi)

Qlispé Raceway Park (formerly the Spokane County Raceway) is a multi-venue motorsport facility in the western United States, in Spokane County, Washington.

Located northeast of Airway Heights and west of the city of Spokane, it includes a 0.250 mi (0.402 km) drag strip, a 2.300 mi (3.701 km) road course, and a 0.500 mi (0.805 km) oval track. The raceway is currently a National Hot Rod Association (NHRA) member; it previously hosted International Hot Rod Association (IHRA) and American Hot Rod Association (AHRA) events. It is used as well for driving schools for marque-specific clubs, and has also hosted ICSCC (International Conference of Sports Car Clubs) championship events.

The average elevation of the facility is approximately 2,350 ft (720 m) above sea level.

Spokane County Raceway hosted 3 NASCAR K&N Pro Series West races, in 2011, 2013 and 2017.

== History ==
The raceway opened 52 years ago in 1974, when investors produced more than two million dollars to build the facility.

Questionable management resulted in a lawsuit against president and operator Orville Moe, and bankruptcy hearings. Moe was eventually fired in June 2006. The track was sold as of April 10, 2008, purchased by the county, and renamed "Spokane County Raceway."

The operator in 2009 was Bucky Austin of Austin Motorsports Management, which had a 25-year contract, but was terminated after less than one year due to mismanagement.

The track then was operated by Charlie Allen and Ron Hodgson; Allen had run the Firebird International Raceway in Arizona since 1983, and Hodgson was part owner of the Castrol Raceway in Edmonton, Alberta. In February 2012, Allen was replaced by Spokane local Craig Smith, originally of Odessa, a one-time successful world champion dragster. In May 2021, it was announced that Spokane County had accepted an offer to sell the raceway for $6.1 million dollars to the Kalispel Tribe of Indians.
