= Montana Raceway Park =

Former racetrack

Coordinates: 48°17′33″N 114°20′15″W

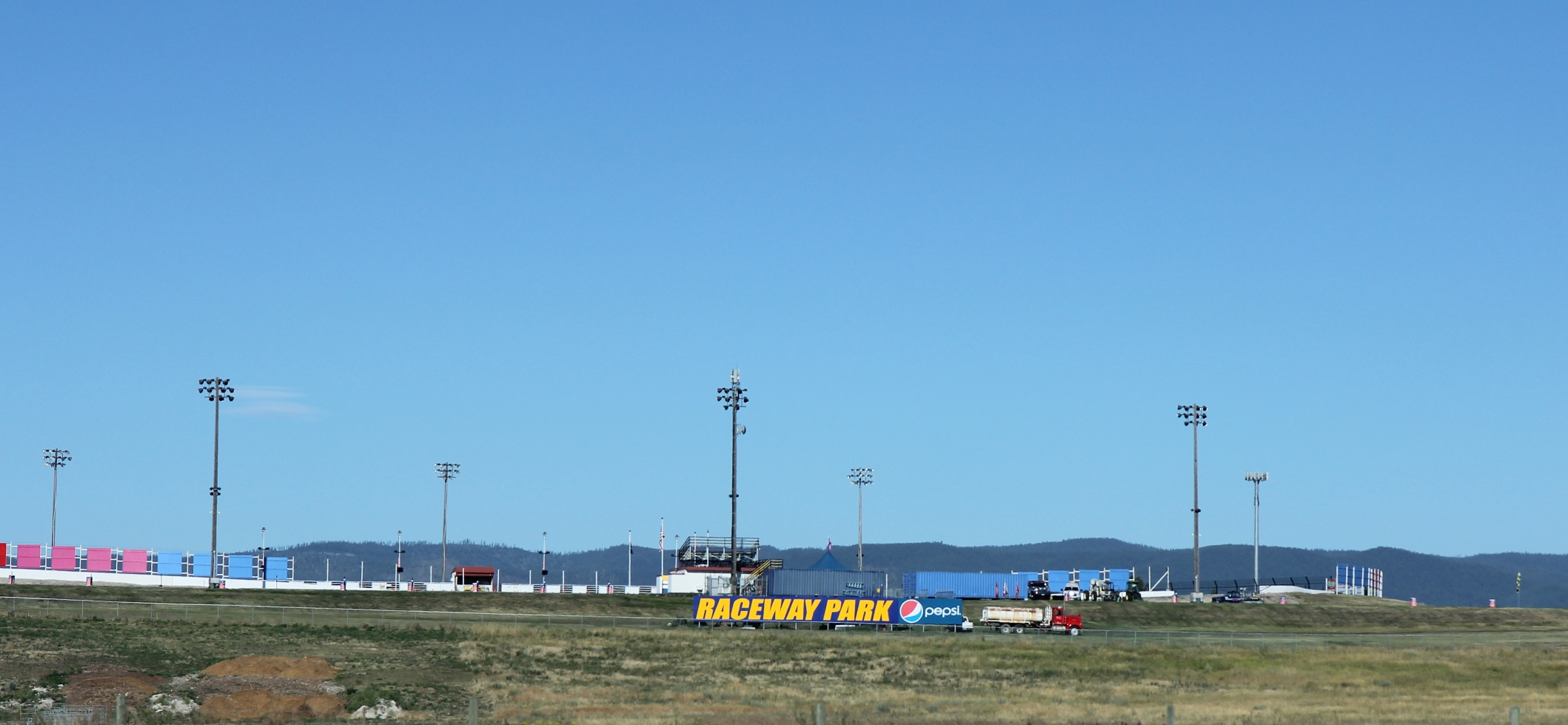
- Exterior for Montana Raceway Park from U.S. Route 93 in 2013
- Location: U.S. Route 93 north of Kalispell, Montana
- Opened: 1991
- Closed: 2020
- Former names: Raceway Park; Kalispell Raceway Park; Flathead Valley Raceway Park
- Major events: Montana 200 (Super Late Models), ARCA Menards Series West, NASCAR K&N Pro Series West
- Surface: paved
- Length: 0.25 miles (0.40 km)

Montana Raceway Park is a closed motorsports facility located near Kalispell, Montana, in the state's Flathead Valley region. It features a 1/4-mile-long high-banked oval track paved with asphalt. Seating at the facility accommodates 4,000 spectators and parking areas can stage more than 100 race teams. The track announced in March 2020 that it would close for the entire 2020 season. In May 2020, the track announced that it would close permanently due to "constant vandalism, declining fan bases and support."

== History ==
The racetrack opened on May 1, 1991, as Raceway Park. During its first year, the facility also carried the names Kalispell Raceway Park and Flathead Valley Raceway Park. Weekly auto races and specialty events are currently the main uses for the facility.

Drivers from the northwestern United States and Canada travel to Montana Raceway Park for the annual Coors Light Montana 200, a racing event hosted by the racetrack each year since the track opened. Typically, a field of approximately 40–50 drivers competes for the 24 positions available in the race, which has yielded more than $50,000 in prize money during past years.

Other racing at the track includes the NASCAR K&N Pro Series West, Canadian Super Truck Racing Series and local divisions of Super Late Models, Super Stocks, Bombers, Hobby Stocks, Hornets, Legends, and Bandoleros.

Beyond racing, the facility hosts other sports competitions and music performances. Foghat, Blue Öyster Cult, Eddie Money, and Alice Cooper have entertained crowds at the racetrack.

Charlotte Motor Speedway and racetrack manager Humpy Wheeler presented their 2007 Promoter of the Year award to the staff and management of Montana Raceway Park.

In March 2020, the track closed for the 2020 season due to the COVID-19 pandemic before releasing its schedule. The track released a statement in May 2020: "Through 30 years of racing as a cornerstone facility in the northwest there has been a lot of ups and downs. Today is the day where we announce that Montana Raceway Park will be closed permanently. This is not an easy decision like any decision where we know there will be heavy hearts but for the past few years there has been constant vandalism, declining fan bases and support. The COVID-19 crisis which has forced us to close our doors for the season will have an unsurvivable economic impact forcing our hand."
