= Stateline Speedway =

Motorsport venue in Busti, New York

- Location: Busti, New York
- Coordinates: 42.00613°N 79.32684°W
- Owner: Bill and Lisa Catania
- Opened: 1956
- Former names: New Stateline Speedway

Oval
- Surface: Clay
- Length: .55 km (0.34 mi)
- Turns: 4

Stateline Speedway is a one-third mile dirt oval raceway located in the Chautauqua-Alleghany (or the western Southern Tier) Region of New York State.

== Overview ==
The Stateline Speedway became a reality when Leonard Briggs and his friends Lloyd Williams, Marv Thorpe and brothers, Don and Jerry Frank secured the deed to a 77-acre abandoned property in the Town of Busti in April 1956. The first race was held on July 21, 1956, while the first feature was won by Emory Mahan driving a 1955 Chevy.

The venue hosted one NASCAR Cup Series event on July 16, 1958, where Shorty Rollins won because most of the top drivers didn't make it due to a long rain delay at a previous race.

On November 1, 2024, Bill Catania and his wife Lisa purchased Stateline Speedway from the Scott and Turner Families, becoming the 4th owners of the track in its 69-year history.

== Events ==
Stateline Speedway races Saturday nights April through mid-August, and features the Super Late Models, Rush Crate Late Models, Rush Stock Cars, Pro Stocks, UMP Modifieds, Rush Pro Modifieds and Compacts.

In 2012, the venue presented the "Empire 50", a Lucas Oil Late Model Dirt Series event. The track has also hosted numerous World of Outlaws Late Model Series events, including 2026. Dick Barton winning the first event and became the first local driver to win a series event. The track has a rich history of curating many national recognized and touring drivers including Chub Frank (Chubzilla), Max Blair, Brian Ruhlman, Dave Hess, and Boom Briggs.
