= 2013 NASCAR K&N Pro Series West =

NASCAR season

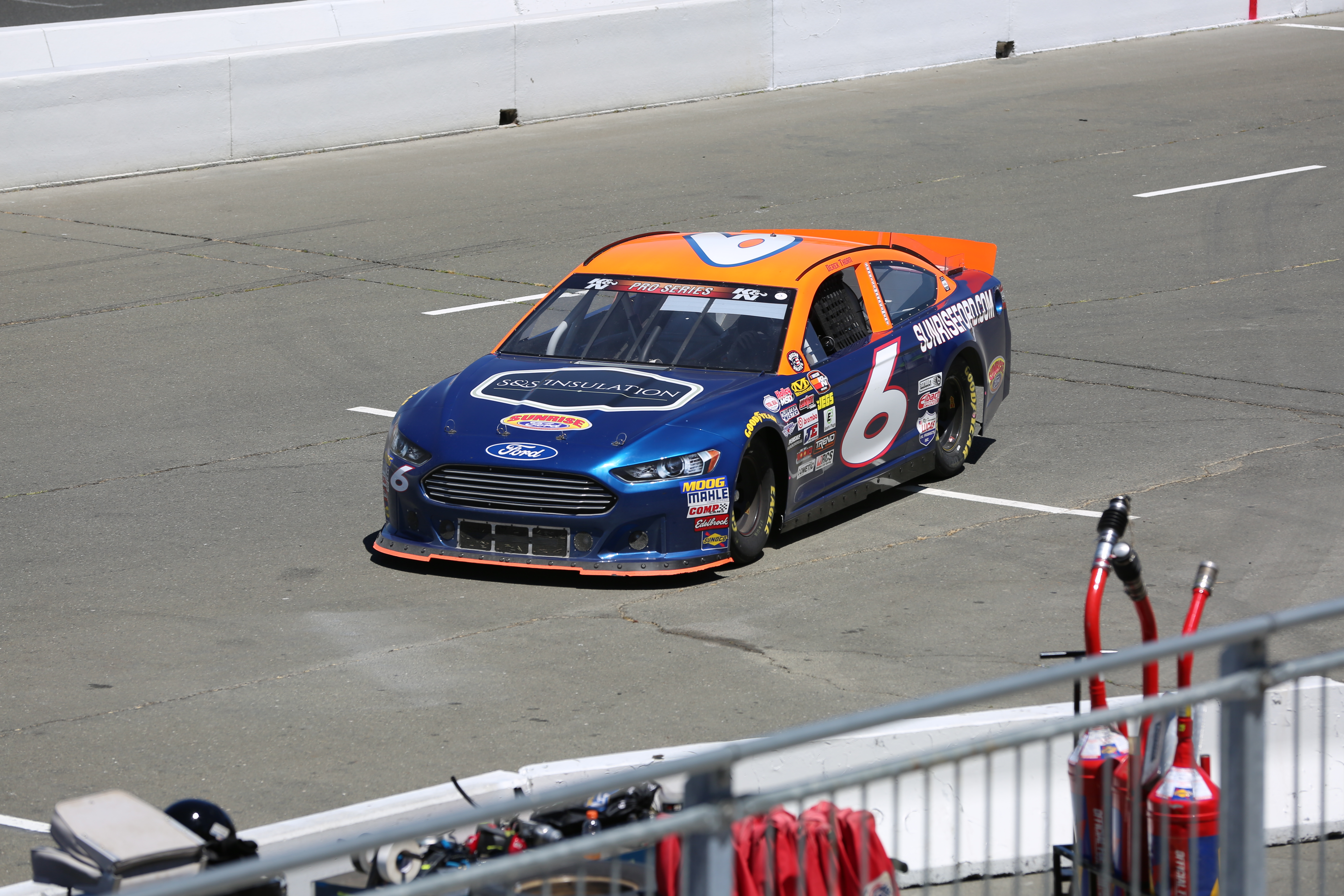
Derek Thorn won the 2013 K&N Pro Series West championship.

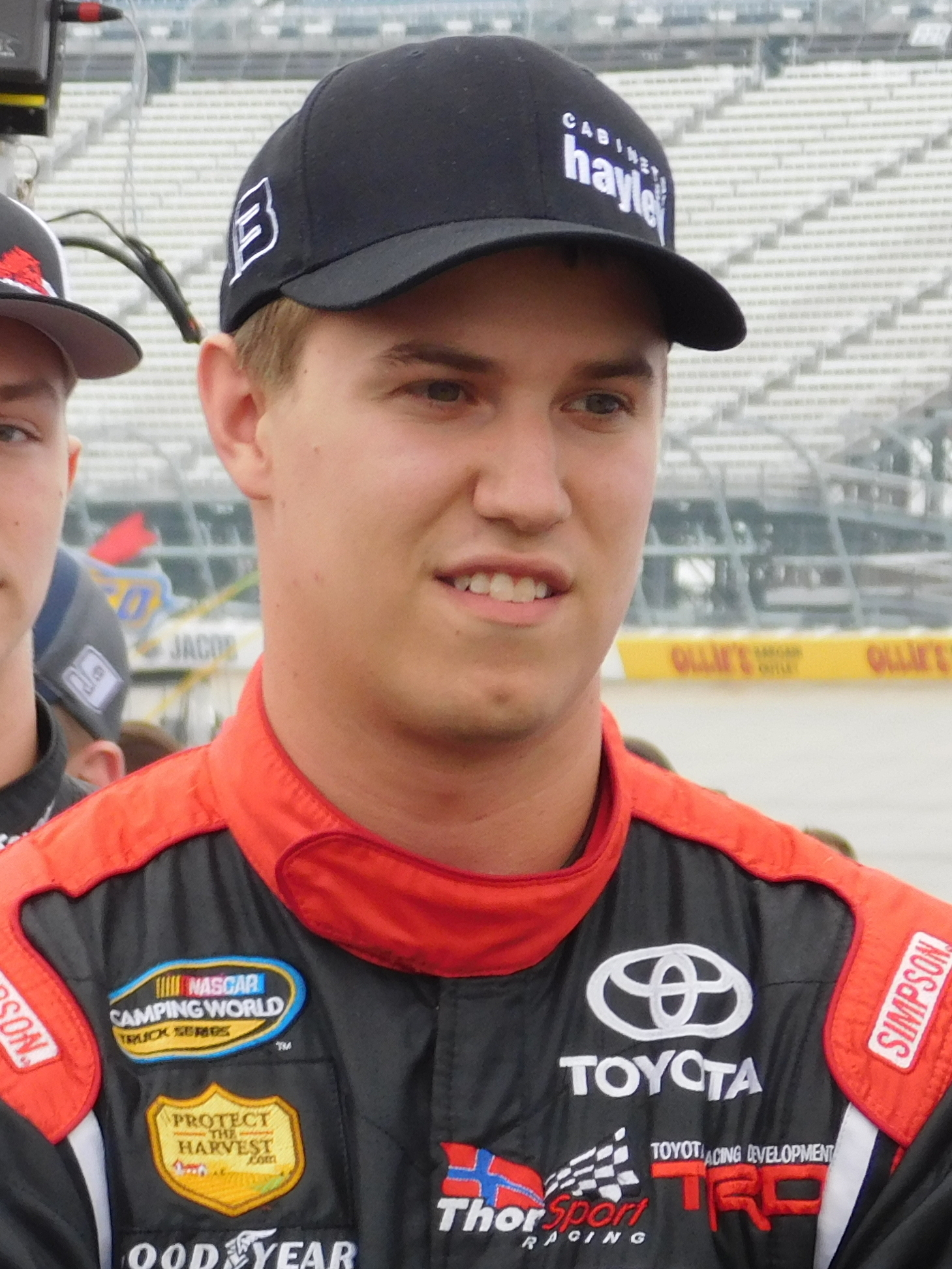
Cameron Hayley finished second behind Thorn in the championship by just 6 points.

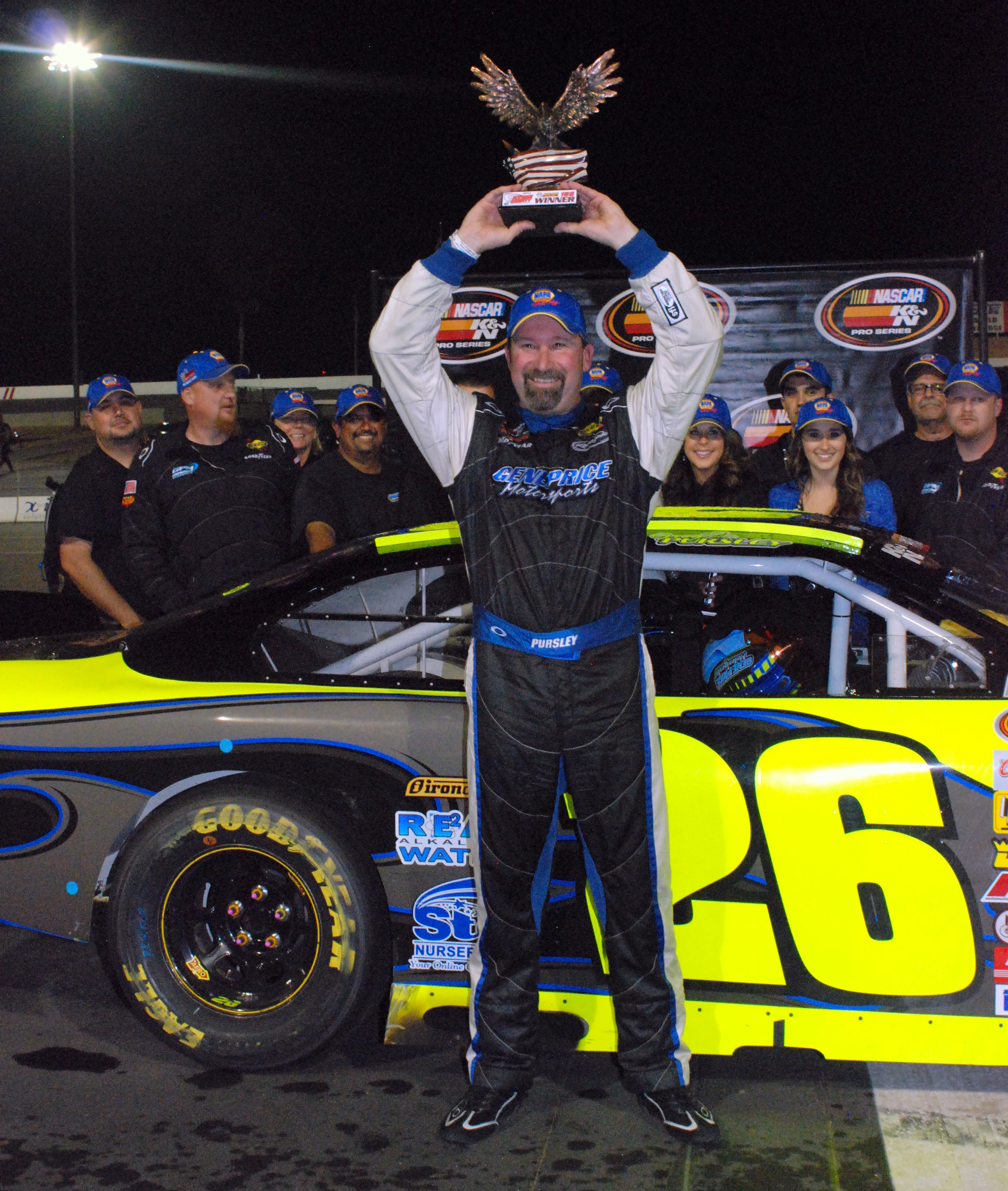
Greg Pursley finished third in the championship.

The 2013 NASCAR K&N Pro Series West was the 60th season of the K&N Pro Series West. It began with the Talking Stick Resort 60 at Phoenix International Raceway on March 2, and ended with the Casino Arizona 100, also at Phoenix, on November 8.

Dylan Kwasniewski entered as the defending series champion, but didn't defend his title as he competed for the 2013 NASCAR K&N Pro Series East championship.

Derek Thorn won his first championship after the last race, winning three races and finishing six points ahead of Cameron Hayley. Hayley, who finished second after finishing in the top-ten in every race, have one win. Third placed Greg Pursley, who had 13 top-ten finishes, won four races. Michael Self, who finished fourth, won three races. Other race winners included Dylan Lupton, Gray Gaulding, Andrew Ranger, and Cole Custer.

== Drivers ==
No.	Manufacturer	Team/Car Owner	Race Driver	Crew Chief
00	Ford 1	Sunrise Ford Racing 1	Cole Custer 2	Tim Huddleston 1
00	Chevrolet 1	Ken Schrader Racing 1	Cole Custer 2	Matt Goslant 1
01	Ford	Dan White	Rich DeLong III 2	Rich DeLong
01	Chevrolet	Harr Racing	Daryl Harr 2	Mike Brown
1	Chevrolet	Roadrunner Motorsports	Shane Golobic 1	Rodney Haygood
1	Chevrolet	Roadrunner Motorsports	Jim Inglebright 1	Rodney Haygood
02	Toyota	SS-Green Light Racing	Gray Gaulding 3	Doug George 1
02	Toyota	SS-Green Light Racing	Gray Gaulding 3	Doug Howe 2
02	Chevrolet	Harr Racing	Carl Harr 2	Bernie Klingenberg 2
2	Chevrolet	Harr Racing	Carl Harr 13	Bernie Klingenberg 13
5	Chevrolet	Charlie Silva	Jack Sellers 1	Jim Hard 1
5	Chevrolet	Charlie Silva	Dylan Hutchison 9	Glenn Hutchison
5	Ford	Charlie Silva	J. D. White 1	Matthew Lee White
5	Chevrolet	Charlie Silva	Thomas Martin 1	John Krebs
5	Ford	Charlie Silva	Rich DeLong III 2	Richard Walker 1
5	Ford	Charlie Silva	Rich DeLong III 2	Rich DeLong 1
6	Ford	Sunrise Ford Racing	Derek Thorn	Bill Sedgwick
07	Ford	GSR Racing	Greg Rayl 2	Dan White 2
07	Ford	GSR Racing	Brady Flaherty 1	Greg Rayl
07	Ford	GSR Racing	Jim Weiler 1	Greg Rayl
8	Chevrolet 2	Borneman Motorsports	Johnny Bornemann III 3	Steve Teets
8	Ford 1	Borneman Motorsports	Johnny Bornemann III 3	Steve Teets
9	Ford	Sunrise Ford Racing	Dylan Lupton (R)	Jeff Schrader
10	Chevrolet	AC Motorsports	Austin Cameron 2	Mike Harvick
12	Toyota	TTC Racing	Giles Thornton (R) 14	Travis Sharpe
14	Toyota	Bob Wood	Travis Milburn 6	Roger Bracken 4
14	Toyota	Bob Wood	Travis Milburn 6	Mark Romero 2
14	Ford	Bob Wood	Andrew Tuttle 1	Adan Alvarado
14	Toyota	Bob Wood	Jamie Krzysik 2	Pete Gebhardt 1
14	Toyota	Bob Wood	Jamie Krzysik 2	Adan Alvarado 1
14	Toyota	Bob Wood	John Wood 4	Mike Holleran
14	Toyota	Bob Wood	Josh Reaume 1	Roger Bracken
14	Toyota	Bob Wood	Jay Beasley 1	Jim Parker
15	Chevrolet	Sellers Racing	Dylan Hutchison 2	Glenn Hutchison
15	Chevrolet	Sellers Racing	Jack Sellers 10	Jim Hard 2
15	Chevrolet	Sellers Racing	Jack Sellers 10	Greg Rayl 2
15	Chevrolet	Sellers Racing	Jack Sellers 10	Thomas Martin 4
15	Chevrolet	Sellers Racing	Jack Sellers 10	Kevin Williams 1
15	Chevrolet	Sellers Racing	Jack Sellers 10	Charlie Silva 1
15	Ford	Sellers Racing	Jim Weiler 2	Greg Rayl
15	Ford	Sellers Racing	Brady Flaherty 1	Greg Rayl
16	Toyota	Bill McAnally Racing	Sergio Peña 3	Ty Joiner
16	Toyota	Bill McAnally Racing	Eric Holmes 11	Trip Bruce 5
16	Toyota	Bill McAnally Racing	Eric Holmes 11	Matt Goslant 1
16	Toyota	Bill McAnally Racing	Eric Holmes 11	Roger Bracken 5
16	Toyota	Bill McAnally Racing	Shane Golobic 1	Roger Bracken
17	Chevrolet	Steve McGowan Motorsports	David Mayhew 5	Charlie Wilson 3
17	Chevrolet	Steve McGowan Motorsports	David Mayhew 5	Terry Henry 1
17	Chevrolet	Steve McGowan Motorsports	David Mayhew 5	Mario Isola 1
18	Toyota	B&B Motorsports	Billy Kann 1	Jim Korneman
18	Toyota	B&B Motorsports	Bill Kann 2	Jim Korneman
19	Chevrolet	Steve McGowan Motorsports	Kyle Heckman 1	Ty Joiner
20	Toyota	Bill McAnally Racing	Brandon McReynolds 2	Trip Bruce
20	Toyota	Bill McAnally Racing	Eric Holmes 1	Trip Bruce
20	Toyota	Bill McAnally Racing	Paulie Harraka 1	Duane Knorr
20	Toyota	Bill McAnally Racing	Jamie Krzysik 1	Duane Knorr
20	Toyota	Bill McAnally Racing	Michael Waltrip 1	Michael Munoz
20	Toyota	Bill McAnally Racing	Chase Briscoe 1	Trip Bruce
20	Toyota	Bill McAnally Racing	Shane Golobic 2	Trip Bruce
21	Chevrolet	Richard Childress Racing	Michael Self	Steve Portenga
24	Ford	Gene Price Motorsports	Cameron Hayley	Jeff Jefferson
25	Chevrolet	Naake-Klauer Motorsports	Tom Klauer 1	Harold Kunsman
26	Ford	Gene Price Motorsports	Greg Pursley	Jerry Pitts
27	Dodge	Hillis Racing	Bobby Hillis Jr. 1	Rick Butler
29	Chevrolet	NTS Motorsports	Dallas Montes 3	Travis Bennett 2
29	Chevrolet	NTS Motorsports	Dallas Montes 3	Gary Collins 1
29	Chevrolet	NTS Motorsports	Brennan Newberry 1	Gary Collins
30	Toyota 9	Marv Brown 1	John Wood 10	Mike Holleran 10
30	Dodge 1	Adan Alvarado 9	John Wood 10	Mike Holleran 10
30	Dodge	Adan Alvarado	Wes Banks 1	Scott Griffith
30	Toyota 1	Adan Alvarado	Jack Chisholm 1	James Wood 1
30	Toyota 1	Adan Alvarado	Travis Milburn 2	Mark Romero 2
30	Chevrolet 1	Adan Alvarado	Travis Milburn 2	Mark Romero 2
31	Chevrolet	Richard Childress Racing	Bobby Runyan Jr. 4	Dusty O'Connell
32	Ford	1/4 Ley Racing	Dale Quarterley 2	Del Markle 1
32	Ford	1/4 Ley Racing	Dale Quarterley 2	Ed Murray 1
33	Chevrolet	Turner Scott Motorsports	Brandon Jones 1	Rich Burgdoff
34	Chevrolet	Allen Montes	Dallas Montes 1	Andy Santerre
36	Chevrolet	Randy Keckley	Jason Irwin 1	Dave Hampton
36	Toyota	Randy Keckley	Jay Beasley 1	Jim Parker
37	Chevrolet	Spraker Racing Enterprises	Anthony Giannone 1	Jeff Spraker
38	Ford	Kart Idaho Racing	Jack Chisholm 6	Dwayne Koski 1
38	Ford	Kart Idaho Racing	Jack Chisholm 6	Andrew Tuttle 4
38	Ford	Kart Idaho Racing	Jack Chisholm 6	James Wood 1
38	Toyota	Kart Idaho Racing	Andrew Tuttle 1	James Wood
38	Ford	Kart Idaho Racing	John Wood 1	Mike Holleran
38	Ford	Kart Idaho Racing	Phyl Zubizareta 1	Andrew Tuttle
38	Toyota	Kart Idaho Racing	Jason Romero 1	Eddie Toronto
40	Chevrolet	Mark Reed	Ryan Reed 1	Michael Munoz
42	Chevrolet 6	Danny Cuzick	Taylor Cuzick	Chuck Carruthers 3
42	Ford 8	Danny Cuzick	Taylor Cuzick	Charlie Wahl 12
42	Dodge 1	Danny Cuzick	Taylor Cuzick	Charlie Wahl 12
43	Chevrolet	Byron Campbell	Jason Fensler 1	Mike Keen
47	Toyota 2	Michelle Ivie	Scott Ivie 5	Tyler Dodge 1
47	Ford 3	Michelle Ivie	Scott Ivie 5	Dave Philpott 4
47	Toyota	Michelle Ivie	Justin Philpott 1	Dave Philpott
48	Chevrolet	Steve Tarpley	Chris Cook 1	Rob Dixon
51	Toyota	Carlos Vieira	Carlos Vieira 5	Mario Isola
52	Chevrolet	Ryan Philpott	Ryan Philpott 1	Chuck Dozhier
52	Ford	Dwayne Koski	Andrew Tuttle 1	James Wood
53	Dodge	NDS Motorsports	Andrew Ranger 2	Mike Olsen
54	Toyota 3	Michael Giannone	Anthony Giannone 4	Michael Munoz 3
54	Chevrolet 1	Michael Giannone	Anthony Giannone 4	Jeff Spraker 1
55	Toyota	Bill McAnally Racing	Michael Waltrip 1	Michael Munoz
56	Ford 1	Richard Bogart	Griffin Steinfield 2	Brent Adams
56	Dodge 1	Richard Bogart	Griffin Steinfield 2	Brent Adams
56	Ford 1	Richard Bogart	Davide Amaduzzi 1	Richard Bogart
61	Chevrolet	Thompson Motorsports	Brett Thompson 8	Will Harris
62	Chevrolet	Erika Csaszi	Joshua Schoonover 2	Ron Esau
71	Chevrolet	Harr Racing	Daryl Harr 13	Mike Brown 13
74	Chevrolet	Thomas Tyrell	Luis Tyrell 5	Mike Nascimento
77	Dodge	Cunningham Motorsports	Austin Wayne Self 1	Chad Bryant
81	Toyota 1	Bill McAnally Racing 1	D.J. Kennington 2	David Wright 1
81	Dodge 1	Dwight Kennedy	D.J. Kennington 2	Dick Midgley 1
81	Dodge	Dwight Kennedy	Darrell Midgley 1	David Wright
82	Chevrolet	Todd Havens	Braeden Havens 3	Chuck Carruthers
83	Chevrolet	Admiraal Racing	Kelly Admiraal 4	Craig Raudman
86	Toyota 1	Tim Spurgeon	Jacob Gomes 1	Paul Gomes
86	Ford 1	Tim Spurgeon	Tim Spurgeon 1	Mike David
88	Chevrolet	Naake-Klauer Motorsports	Dave Smith 1	Michael Naake
88	Chevrolet	Naake-Klauer Motorsports	Dylan Hutchison 1	Michael Naake
89	Chevrolet	TEI Motorsports	Matt Tifft 4	Rob Dixon
97	Chevrolet	Team Little Racing	Jesse Little 1	Kris Bowen
99	Toyota	Bill McAnally Racing	Jamie Krzysik 2	Matt Goslant 1
99	Toyota	Bill McAnally Racing	Jamie Krzysik 2	Pete Gebhardt 1
99	Toyota	Bill McAnally Racing	Patrick Staropoli 2	Duane Knorr
99	Toyota	Bill McAnally Racing	Chase Briscoe 2	Duane Knorr

== Schedule ==
The UNOH Battle at the Beach was an exhibition race and did not count towards the championship.

No.	Race title	Track	Date
	UNOH Battle at the Beach (Note: The UNOH Battle at the Beach was an exhibition race at Daytona (short track) and was held as a combined event, with competitors from the K&N Pro Series West competing along with competitors for the K&N Pro Series East.)	Daytona International Speedway, Daytona Beach, Florida	February 19
1	Talking Stick Resort 60	Phoenix International Raceway, Avondale, Arizona	March 2
2	G-Oil 150	Stockton 99 Speedway, Stockton, California	May 4
3	NAPA Know How 150	Brainerd International Raceway, Brainerd, Minnesota	May 25
4	Casey's General Store 150 (Note: The Casey's General Store 150 was held as a combined event, with competitors from the K&N Pro Series West competing along with competitors for the K&N Pro Series East. The race was run with a series-based point distribution, where drivers received points and statistical credit for their finish relative to other drivers in their series, not to the whole field in general.)	Iowa Speedway, Newton, Iowa	June 7
5	Toyota/G-Oil 150	Lebanon I-44 Speedway, Lebanon, Missouri	June 9
6	Carneros 200	Sonoma Raceway, Sonoma, California	June 22
7	Toyota NAPA Auto Parts 150	Colorado National Speedway, Erie, Colorado	July 27
8	Pork Be Inspired 150 (Note: The Pork Be Inspired 150 was held as a combined event, with competitors from the K&N Pro Series West competing along with competitors for the K&N Pro Series East. The race was run with a series-based point distribution, where drivers received points and statistical credit for their finish relative to other drivers in their series, not to the whole field in general.)	Iowa Speedway, Newton, Iowa	August 2
9	NAPA Auto Parts 150 Presented by Toyota	Evergreen Speedway, Monroe, Washington	August 17
10	Toyota/NAPA Auto Parts 150	Spokane County Raceway, Spokane, Washington	August 24
11	iON Camera Utah Grand Prix	Miller Motorsports Park, Tooele, Utah	September 14
12	NAPA Auto Parts 150	NAPA Speedway, Albuquerque, New Mexico	September 28
13	Toyota/NAPA Auto Parts 150	All American Speedway, Roseville, California	October 12
14	NAPA Auto Parts 150	Kern County Raceway Park, Bakersfield, California	October 26
15	Casino Arizona 50	Phoenix International Speedway, Avondale, Arizona	November 8

== Results and standings ==
=== Races ===
No.	Race	Pole position	Most laps led	Winning driver	Manufacturer
	UNOH Battle at the Beach	Greg Pursley	Greg Pursley	Cameron Hayley	Ford
1	Talking Stick Resort 60	Greg Pursley	Greg Pursley	Greg Pursley	Ford
2	G-Oil 150	Cameron Hayley	Derek Thorn	Derek Thorn	Ford
3	NAPA Know How 150	Andrew Ranger	Derek Thorn	Michael Self	Chevrolet
4	Casey's General Store 150	Anderson Bowen	Michael Self	Michael Self	Chevrolet
5	Toyota/G-Oil 150	Cameron Hayley	Cameron Hayley	Michael Self	Chevrolet
6	Carneros 200	Cameron Hayley	Michael Self	Derek Thorn	Ford
7	Toyota NAPA Auto Parts 150	Derek Thorn	Derek Thorn	Derek Thorn	Ford
8	Pork Be Inspired 150	Cameron Hayley	Cole Custer	Greg Pursley	Ford
9	NAPA Auto Parts 150 Presented by Toyota	Cameron Hayley	Derek Thorn	Dylan Lupton	Ford
10	Toyota/NAPA Auto Parts 150	Cameron Hayley	Michael Self	Greg Pursley	Ford
11	iON Camera Utah Grand Prix	Derek Thorn	Cameron Hayley	Andrew Ranger	Dodge
12	NAPA Auto Parts 150	Derek Thorn	Carl Harr	Greg Pursley	Ford
13	Toyota/NAPA Auto Parts 150	Derek Thorn	Derek Thorn	Cameron Hayley	Ford
14	NAPA Auto Parts 150	Gray Gaulding	Greg Pursley	Greg Pursley	Ford
15	Casino Arizona 50	Cole Custer	Cole Custer	Gray Gaulding	Toyota

=== Drivers' championship ===
(key) Bold - Pole position awarded by time. Italics - Pole position set by final practice results or rainout. * – Most laps led. ** – All laps led.

Pos	Driver	PHO	S99	BIR	IOW	L44	SON	CNS	IOW	EVG	SRP	MMP	SMP	AAS	KCR	PHO	Points
1	Derek Thorn	4	1**	2*	18	4	1	**1***	16	3*	2	9	**2**	**2***	6	15	622
2	Cameron Hayley	2	**3**	5	8	**7***	**2**	3	6	**10**	**3**	6*	3	1	5	3	616
3	Greg Pursley	**1***	10	3	4	9	21	5	4	2	1	2	1	2	1*	14	607
4	Michael Self	3	15	1	1*	1	3*	6	11	16	6*	4	5	4	2	9	598
5	Dylan Lupton **(R)**	14	9	4	26	3	8	10	21	1	7	3	7	15	7	28	522
6	Taylor Cuzick	10	20	7	30	8	23	7	22	6	14	11	6	22	23	10	475
7	Daryl Harr	28	21	17	17	2	14	12	40	8	12	7	14	9	11	18	469
8	Carl Harr	13	11	12	29	11	12	14	26	5	20	10	9*	18	20	25	463
9	Giles Thornton **(R)**		7	13	25	12	24	4	13	13	4	17	15	13	25	24	433
10	John Wood	18	12	14	31	14	19	18	28	18	13	12	10	21	24	22	423
11	Eric Holmes		5		35	6	9	8	37	12	18	19	4	3	3		418
12	Dylan Hutchison	26	19	8	27	5	15	17	38	15	15	16		21			363
13	Jack Sellers	15	DNQ	19	34	13	26	19	25	7	16	15		19			328
14	Brett Thompson	8	8	18	39	16	17	9								8	253
15	Travis Milburn	20	22				6	11			8	18		16	16		235
16	Jack Chisholm	19						15			17	14	13		18	19	222
17	Jamie Krzysik	11	13		21	10		2									178
18	David Mayhew	25					4		36						4	4	173
19	Luis Tyrrell		4								10			10	14	16	166
20	Carlos Vieira	12	17				32							12	15		132
21	Matt Tifft				10				34	9		5			9	11	130
22	Kelly Admiraal	23					7			17						7	123
23	Scott Ivie	16					31					13			19	20	121
24	Sergio Peña	5	2	9													116
25	Dallas Montes	24	6	11											22		113
26	Shane Golobic		DNQ											8	8	21	112
27	Gray Gaulding	6			9				33						**21**	1	109
28	Anthony Giannone	30		16	23			13	19						26	29	106
29	Bobby Runyan Jr.		16				22								17	30	91
30	Braeden Havens									4	9					31	88
31	Chase Briscoe												8		13	27	84
32	Andrew Ranger			**10**								1					81
33	Johnny Borneman III						29								12	12	79
34	Andrew Tuttle			15		15								23			79
35	Patrick Staropoli										7			10			77
36	Brandon McReynolds	9			36				13							5	74
37	Jim Weiler													18	17	27	70
38	Cole Custer		18		6				**1****							**6***	66
39	Rich DeLong III	22	DNQ												28	DNQ	65
40	Austin Cameron						16					8					64
41	Jay Beasley												17	11			60
42	Bill Kann							16					12				60
43	Michael Waltrip										11			20			57
44	D. J. Kennington	7														26	55
45	Dale Quarterley			6			28										54
46	Joshua Schoonover									19	19						50
47	Griffin Steinfield	29	14														45
48	Greg Rayl	17	DNQ														45
49	Jesse Little				19				5							2	42
50	Paulie Harraka						5										39
51	Brady Flaherty						27									23	38
52	Ryan Philpott	27	24														37
53	Dave Smith						10										34
54	Jason Fensler														10		34
55	J. D. White												11				34
56	Tim Spurgeon						11										33
57	Phyl Zubizareta									11							33
58	Jim Inglebright						13										31
59	Austin Wayne Self															13	31
60	Josh Reaume									14							30
61	Thomas Martin													14			30
62	Jason Irwin												16				28
63	Brandon Jones				11				29							17	27
64	Wes Banks						18										26
65	Tom Klauer						20										24
66	Billy Kann	21															23
67	Jacob Gomes		23														21
68	Jason Romero													24			20
69	Justin Philpott		DNQ														19
70	Davide Amaduzzi						25										19
71	Darrell Midgley		DNQ														16
72	Brennan Newberry						30										14
73	Chris Cook						33										11
74	Ryan Reed						34										10
75	Kyle Heckman						35										9
76	Bobby Hillis Jr.	DNQ															0
Drivers ineligible for K&N Pro Series West points
	Dylan Kwasniewski				2				12								
	Eddie MacDonald				15				2								
	Brett Moffitt				3				9								
	Daniel Suárez				16				3								
	Ben Rhodes				5				10								
	Cale Conley				7				30								
	Kenzie Ruston				41				7								
	Ryan Gifford				33				8								
	Ben Kennedy				12				14								
	Bryan Ortiz				13				39								
	Anderson Bowen				**14**				23								
	Brandon Gdovic				38				15								
	Johnny VanDoorn				20				18								
	Mackena Bell				22				20								
	Austin Hill				37				24								
	Scott Heckert				24				27								
	Austin Dyne				28				31								
	Akinori Ogata				32				32								
	Brodie Kostecki				42				35								
	Jimmy Weller III				40												
	Zach Hausler				DNQ												

== See also ==
- 2013 NASCAR Sprint Cup Series
- 2013 NASCAR Nationwide Series
- 2013 NASCAR Camping World Truck Series
- 2013 ARCA Racing Series
- 2013 NASCAR K&N Pro Series East
- 2013 NASCAR Whelen Modified Tour
- 2013 NASCAR Whelen Southern Modified Tour
- 2013 NASCAR Canadian Tire Series
- 2013 NASCAR Toyota Series
- 2013 NASCAR Whelen Euro Series
