= Jay Beasley =

American racing driver

- Born: March 7, 1992 (age 34); Las Vegas, Nevada, U.S.

ARCA Menards Series East career
- 41 races run over 3 years
- Best finish: 7th (2017)
- First race: 2014 New Smyrna 150 Presented by JEGS (New Smyrna)
- Last race: 2017 National Fallen Firefighters Foundation 125 (Dover)
Wins	Top tens	Poles
0	19	0

ARCA Menards Series West career
- 3 races run over 2 years
- Best finish: 41st (2013)
- First race: 2013 NAPA Auto Parts 150 (Albuquerque)
- Last race: 2014 Casino Arizona 100 (Phoenix)
Wins	Top tens	Poles
0	0	0
- Statistics up to date as of November 16, 2024.

Jay Beasley (born March 7, 1992) is an American former professional stock car racing driver who has competed in the NASCAR K&N Pro Series East and the NASCAR K&N Pro Series West.

Beasley has also previously competed in the SRL Spears Southwest Tour Series.

== Motorsports results ==
=== NASCAR ===
(key) (Bold - Pole position awarded by qualifying time. Italics - Pole position earned by points standings or practice time. * – Most laps led.)

==== K&N Pro Series East ====
NASCAR K&N Pro Series East results
Year	Team	No.	Make	1	2	3	4	5	6	7	8	9	10	11	12	13	14	15	16	NKNPSEC	Pts	Ref
2014	Rev Racing	42	Toyota	NSM; 24	DAY; 16	BRI; 15	GRE; 19	RCH; 28	IOW; 4	BGS; 9	FIF; 7	LGY; 16	NHA; 4	COL; 13	IOW; 21	GLN; 14	VIR; 23	GRE; 14	DOV; 16	13th	461	
2015	Rev Racing	42	Toyota	NSM; 25	GRE; 20	BRI; 21	IOW; 8	BGS; 4	LGY; 5	COL; 4	NHA; 26	IOW; 8	GLN; 9	MOT	VIR	RCH	DOV; 21			16th	333	
2017	Rev Racing	42	Toyota	NSM; 18	GRE; 14	BRI; 14	SBO; 8	SBO; 10	MEM; 5	BLN; 4	TMP; 9	NHA; 14	IOW; 16	GLN; 5	LGY; 8	NJE; 4	DOV; 5			7th	482	

==== K&N Pro Series West ====
NASCAR K&N Pro Series West results
Year	Team	No.	Make	1	2	3	4	5	6	7	8	9	10	11	12	13	14	15	NKNPSWC	Pts	Ref
2013	Bob Wood	14	Toyota	PHO	S99	BIR	IOW	L44	SON	CNS	IOW	EVG	SRP	MMP	SMP; 17				41st	60	
2013	Randy Keckley	36	Toyota													AAS; 11	KCR	PHO	41st	60	
2014	Steve Portenga Racing	21	Chevy	PHO	IRW	S99	IOW	KCR	SON	SLS	CNS	IOW	EVG	KCR	MMP	AAS	PHO; 29		84th	15	
