= Dylan Hutchison =

American racing driver (born 1994)

- Born: October 6, 1994 (age 32); Sacramento, California, U.S.

ARCA Menards Series West career
- 24 races run over 3 years
- Best finish: 12th (2013)
- First race: 2011 Toyota / NAPA Auto Parts 150 (Roseville)
- Last race: 2013 Toyota / NAPA Auto Parts 150 (Roseville)
Wins	Top tens	Poles
0	5	0
- Statistics up to date as of November 26, 2024.

Dylan Hutchison (born October 6, 1994) is an American former professional stock car racing driver who has competed in the NASCAR K&N Pro Series West from 2011 to 2013.

Hutchison has also previously competed in the Pacific Challenge Series, the King of the Wing National Sprint Car Shootout Series, and the Orchex Western Sprintcar Series.

== Motorsports results ==
=== NASCAR ===
(key) (Bold - Pole position awarded by qualifying time. Italics - Pole position earned by points standings or practice time. * – Most laps led.)

==== K&N Pro Series East ====
NASCAR K&N Pro Series East results
Year	Team	No.	Make	1	2	3	4	5	6	7	8	9	10	11	12	13	14	NKNPSEC	Pts	Ref
2012	Charlie Silva	5	Chevy	BRI	GRE	RCH	IOW; DNQ	BGS	JFC	LGY	CNB	COL	IOW	NHA	DOV	GRE	CAR	N/A	0	

==== K&N Pro Series West ====
NASCAR K&N Pro Series West results
Year	Team	No.	Make	1	2	3	4	5	6	7	8	9	10	11	12	13	14	15	NKNPSWC	Pts	Ref
2011	Charlie Silva	5	Chevy	PHO	AAS	MMP	IOW	LVS	SON	IRW	EVG	PIR	CNS	MRP	SPO	AAS; 19	PHO		83rd	106	
2012	Charlie Silva	5	Chevy	PHO; 23	LHC; 12	MMP; 22		IOW; DNQ	BIR; 9	LVS; 8	SON; 28	EVG; 17	CNS; 20	IOW	PIR; 30	SMP	AAS; 20	PHO	14th	316	
2012	Sellers Racing	15	Chevy				S99; 11												14th	316	
2013	Sellers Racing	15	Chevy	PHO; 26	S99; 19														12th	363	
2013	Charlie Silva	5	Chevy			BIR; 8	IOW; 9	L44; 5	SON; 15	CNS; 17	IOW; 13	EVG; 15	SPO; 15	MMP; 16	SMP				12th	363	
2013	Naake-Klauer Motorsports	88	Chevy													AAS; 7	KCR	PHO	12th	363	
