= Ryan Philpott =

American racing driver (born 1983)

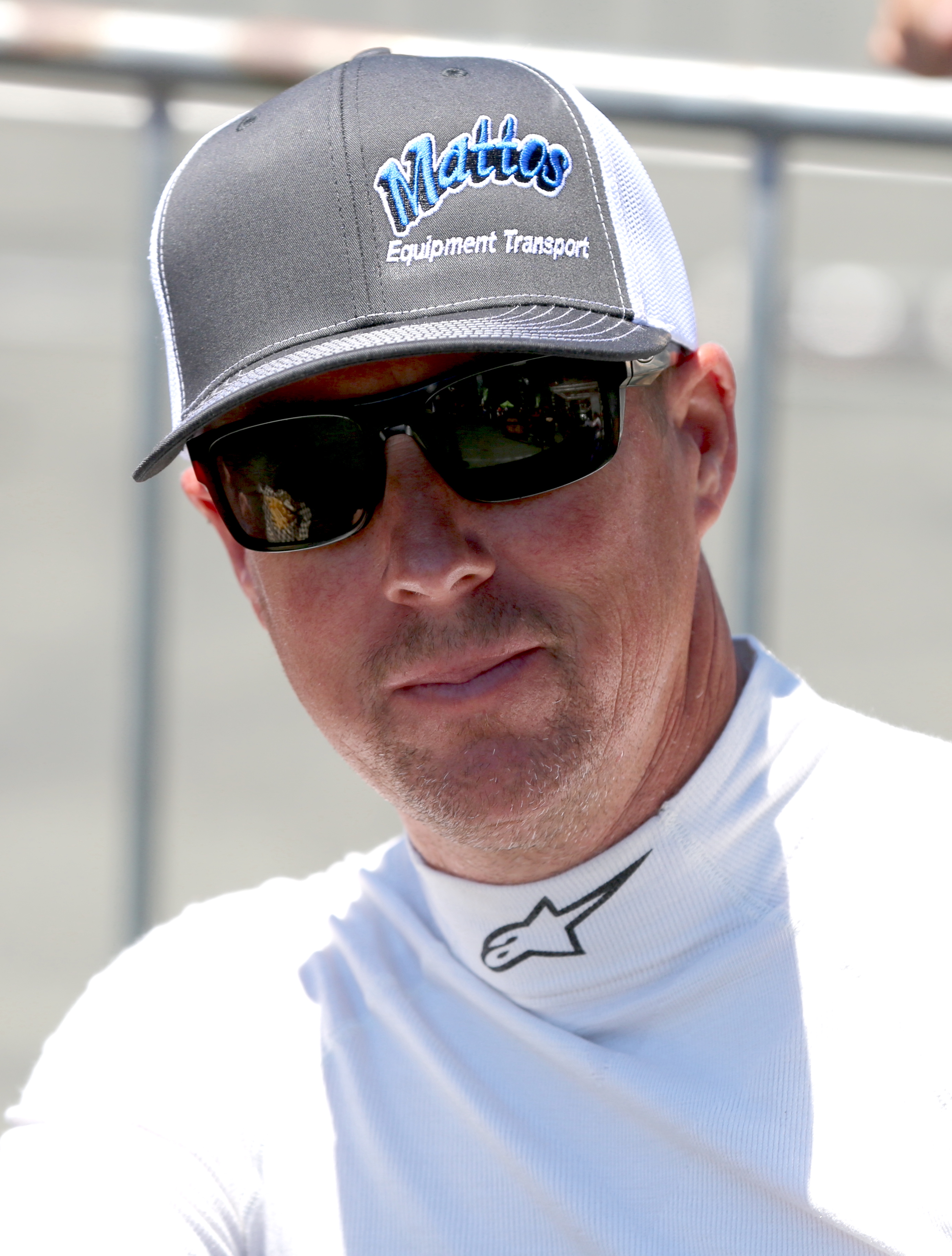
- Philpott at Sonoma Raceway in 2026
- Born: March 21, 1983 (age 43); Tracy, California, U.S.

ARCA Menards Series West career
- 45 races run over 11 years
- Best finish: 9th (2011)
- First race: 2007 Gamel RV Centers 200 (Altamont)
- Last race: 2026 General Tire 150 (Sonoma)
Wins	Top tens	Poles
0	10	0
- Statistics up to date as of June 26, 2026.

Ryan Philpott (born March 21, 1983) is an American professional stock car racing driver. He last competed part-time in the ARCA Menards Series West, driving the No. 52 Toyota for Philpott Race Cars.

== Racing career ==
In 2007, Philpott would make his debut in the NASCAR West Series at Altamont Motorsports Park, driving the No. 52 Ford for Pacific Motorsports, having previously failed to qualify for the Irwindale Speedway event earlier in the year; he would start twelfth but would finish in 22nd after suffering a fuel line issue halfway through the race. It was during this year that he would win the NASCAR Western Late Model championship at Altamont. He would then run four more races in the West Series the following year, getting a best finish of thirteenth at Altamont.

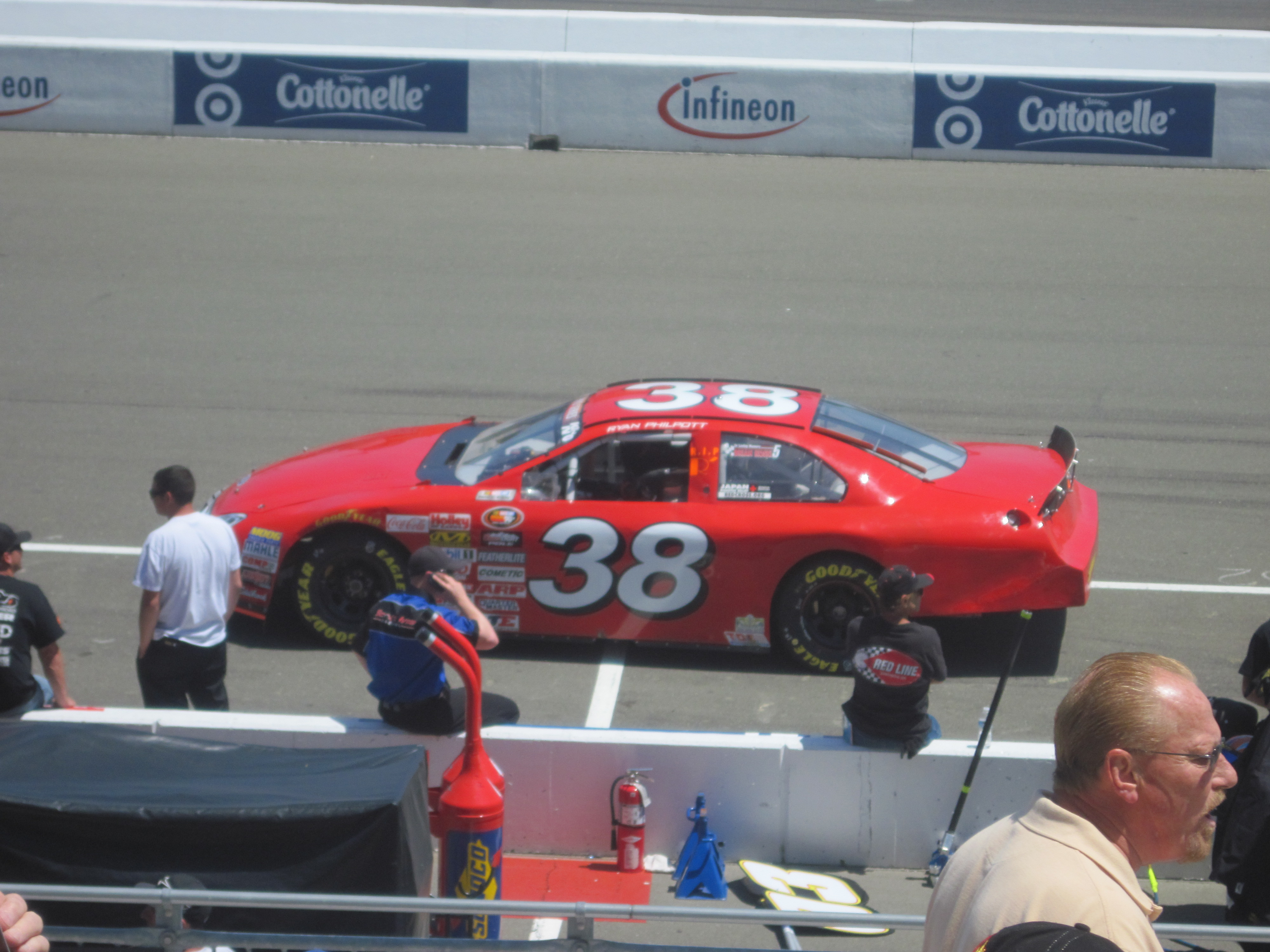
Philpott's No. 38 car at Sonoma in 2011

Afterwards, Philpott would not compete for the next two years, but were eventually make his return to the series in 2011. That year, he ran the first twelve races of the year for Mike Holleran in the No. 38 Ford before driving for his own team for the final two races of the year at All American Speedway and Phoenix International Raceway; it was in the former event where he would get his best result of the year in seventh place. He would go on to finish ninth in the final points standings with four top-ten finishes. He would return to run the full schedule in 2012, this time for his own team in the No. 52 Ford, where he would finish tenth in the points standings. Philpott would then run the first two races of the following season for Dwayne Koski, finishing 27th at Phoenix due to a crash, and 24th at Stockton 99 Speedway after running twelve laps due to overheating issues.

From 2014 to 2020, Philpott would compete in various series such as the SRL Spears Southwest Tour Series, the Budweiser Crown Series, the and Pacific Challenge Series.

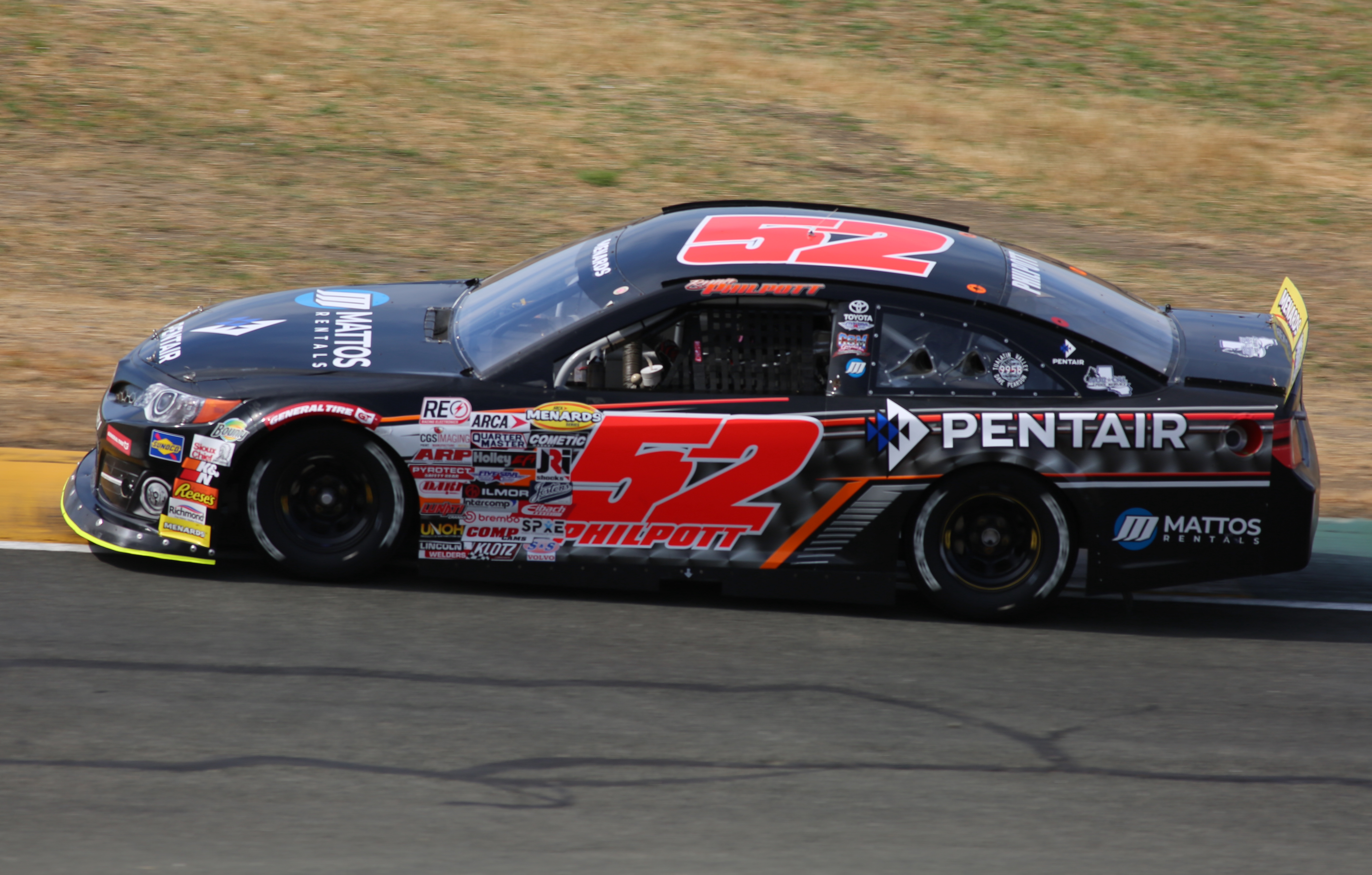
Philpott's No. 52 ARCA car at Sonoma in 2023

In 2021, Philpott would return to the now ARCA Menards Series West at Sonoma Raceway, driving the No. 52 Chevrolet for his own team, Philpott Race Cars, where he would start twentieth and finish on the lead lap in ninth place. He would return to Sonoma the following season, where he would finish seventeenth due to a crash late in the race, and would run at Portland International Raceway later in the year, finishing in sixth. In 2023, Philpott would run at both Portland and Sonoma, failing to finish in both races placing 19th at Portland due to engine issues midway through the race, and 26th at Sonoma due to axle issues, before making his first oval start since 2013 at Shasta Speedway, where he would finish thirteenth.

== Motorsports results ==
=== NASCAR ===
(key) (Bold – Pole position awarded by qualifying time. Italics – Pole position earned by points standings or practice time. * – Most laps led.)

==== K&N Pro Series East ====
NASCAR K&N Pro Series East results
Year	Team	No.	Make	1	2	3	4	5	6	7	8	9	10	11	12	13	14	NKNPSEC	Pts	Ref
2011	Mike Holleran	38	Ford	GRE	SBO	RCH	IOW; DNQ	BGS	JFC	LGY	NHA	COL	GRE	NHA	DOV			N/A	0	
2012	Philpott Race Cars	52	Ford	BRI	GRE	RCH	IOW; DNQ	BGS	JFC	LGY	CNB	COL	IOW	NHA	DOV	GRE	CAR	N/A	0	

=== ARCA Menards Series West ===
(key) (Bold – Pole position awarded by qualifying time. Italics – Pole position earned by points standings or practice time. * – Most laps led. ** – All laps led.)

ARCA Menards Series West results
Year	Team	No.	Make	1	2	3	4	5	6	7	8	9	10	11	12	13	14	15	AMSWC	Pts	Ref
2007	Pacific Motorsports	52	Ford	CTS	PHO	AMP	ELK	IOW	CNS	SON	DCS	IRW; DNQ	MMP	EVG	CSR	AMP; 22			62nd	97	
2008	Pacific Motorsports	52	Ford	AAS; 23	PHO; 29	CTS	IOW	CNS	SON; 23	IRW	DCS	EVG	MMP	IRW	AMP; 13	AAS			28th	388	
2011	Mike Holleran	38	Ford	PHO; 23	AAS; 9	MMP; 29	IOW; DNQ	LVS; 13	SON; 19	IRW; 14	EVG; 13	PIR; 10	CNS; 10	MRP; 13	SPO; 19				9th	1660	
2011	Philpott Race Cars	52	Ford													AAS; 7	PHO; 16		9th	1660	
2012	Philpott Race Cars	52	Ford	PHO; 16	LHC; 17	MMP; 16	S99; 23	IOW; DNQ	BIR; 14	LVS; 10	SON; 14	EVG; 9	CNS; 22	IOW; 6	PIR; 21	SMP; 21	AAS; 21	PHO; 17	10th	420	
2013	Dwayne Koski	52	Ford	PHO; 27	S99; 24	BIR	IOW	L44	SON	CNS	IOW	EVG	SPO	MMP	SMP	AAS	KCR	PHO	52nd	37	
2021	Philpott Race Cars	52	Chevy	PHO	SON; 9	IRW	CNS	IRW	PIR	LVS	AAS	PHO							48th	35	
2022	Philpott Race Cars	52	Toyota	PHO	IRW	KCR	PIR	SON; 17	IRW	EVG	PIR; 6	AAS	LVS	PHO					42nd	65	
2023	Philpott Race Cars	52	Toyota	PHO	IRW	KCR	PIR; 19	SON; 26	IRW	SHA; 13	EVG	AAS	LVS						21st	109	
2023	Philpott Race Cars	52	Chevy											MAD; 9	PHO				21st	109	
2024	Philpott Race Cars	52	Chevy	PHO	KER; 14	PIR													38th	44	
2024	Philpott Race Cars	52	Toyota				SON; 30	IRW	IRW	SHA	TRI	MAD	AAS	KER	PHO				38th	44	
2025	Philpott Race Cars	52	Toyota	KER	PHO	TUC	CNS	KER	SON; 12	TRI	PIR	AAS	MAD	LVS	PHO				58th	32	
2026	Philpott Race Cars	52	Toyota	KER	PHO	TUC	SHA	CNS	TRI	SON; 11	PIR	AAS	MAD	LVS	PHO	KER			60th	33	
