= Anthony Giannone =

American racing driver (born 1995)

- Born: September 19, 1995 (age 31); Colorado Springs, Colorado, U.S.

ARCA Menards Series East career
- 2 races run over 1 year
- Best finish: 43rd (2013)
- First race: 2013 Casey's General Store 150 (Iowa)
- Last race: 2013 Pork Be Inspired 150 (Iowa)
Wins	Top tens	Poles
0	1	0

ARCA Menards Series West career
- 20 races run over 3 years
- Best finish: 10th (2014)
- First race: 2012 Street Car Showdown (Brainerd)
- Last race: 2014 NAPA Auto Parts / Toyota 150 (Evergreen)
Wins	Top tens	Poles
0	2	0
- Statistics up to date as of November 24, 2024.

Anthony Giannone (born September 19, 1995) is an American former professional stock car racing driver who has competed in the NASCAR K&N Pro Series East and the NASCAR K&N Pro Series West.

Giannone has also competed in the SRL Spears Southwest Tour Series and the Racecar Factory Spec Late Model Touring Series.

== Motorsports results ==
=== NASCAR ===
(key) (Bold - Pole position awarded by qualifying time. Italics - Pole position earned by points standings or practice time. * – Most laps led.)

==== K&N Pro Series East ====
NASCAR K&N Pro Series East results
Year	Team	No.	Make	1	2	3	4	5	6	7	8	9	10	11	12	13	14	NKNPSEC	Pts	Ref
2013	Spraker Racing	37	Chevy	BRI	GRE	FIF	RCH	BGS	IOW; 17	LGY	COL	IOW; 14	VIR	GRE	NHA	DOV	RAL	43rd	57	

==== K&N Pro Series West ====
NASCAR K&N Pro Series West results
Year	Team	No.	Make	1	2	3	4	5	6	7	8	9	10	11	12	13	14	15	NKNPSWC	Pts	Ref
2012	Michael Giannone	54	Chevy	PHO	LHC	MMP	S99	IOW	BIR; 19	LVS	SON	EVG; 21	CNS; 19	IOW	PIR	SMP; 16	AAS	PHO; 18	23rd	127	
2013	Michael Giannone	54	Toyota	PHO; 30	S99												KCR; 26	PHO; 29	28th	106	
2013	Spraker Racing	37	Chevy			BIR; 16	IOW	L44	SON										28th	106	
2013	Michael Giannone	54	Chevy							CNS; 13	IOW	EVG	SRP	MMP	SMP	AAS			28th	106	
2014	Michael Giannone	54	Toyota	PHO; 20	IRW; 23	S99; 8	IOW; 7	KCR; 9					EVG; 18	KCR	MMP	AAS	PHO		10th	288	
2014	Michael Giannone	54	Chevy						SON; 28	SLS; 11	CNS; 13	IOW; 15							10th	288	
