= 2004 NASCAR West Series =

51st season of the NASCAR West Series

The 2004 NASCAR West Series, also known as the Grand National West Series, was the 51st season of the series and first since 1970 without a title sponsor, specifically title sponsor Winston. The title was won by Mike Duncan, his first in the series.

== Schedule and results ==
The 2004 season included 13 individual races, although Phoenix International Raceway, Mesa Marin Raceway, Stockton 99 Speedway, and Irwindale Speedway hosted two races each.

Date	Name	Racetrack	Location	Winner
January 25	United Rentals 150	Phoenix International Raceway	Avondale, Arizona	Ken Schrader
March 27	Lucas Oil 150	Mesa Marin Raceway	Bakersfield, California	David Gilliland
May 1	King Taco 200	California Speedway	Fontana, California	Ken Schrader
May 29	Havoline / NAPA Auto Parts 150	Stockton 99 Speedway	Stockton, California	Austin Cameron
July 17	Coors Light 200	Evergreen Speedway	Monroe, Washington	Austin Cameron
July 31	NAPA 150 Pres. by Southern Calif. Pipe Traders	Irwindale Speedway	Irwindale, California	Austin Cameron
August 14	Dodge Country / Havoline / NAPA 200	Stockton 99 Speedway	Stockton, California	Mike David
September 6	NAPA 200	Rocky Mountain Raceways	West Valley City, Utah	Austin Cameron
September 19	NAPA 200 Presented by NAPA Belts & Hose	Douglas County Speedway	Roseburg, Oregon	Scott Lynch
October 3	Subway 150	Phoenix International Raceway	Avondale, Arizona	Scott Lynch
October 9	NAPA 150	Colorado National Speedway	Erie, Colorado	Mike Duncan
October 17	October Classic 150 Presented by StarNursery.com	Mesa Marin Raceway	Bakersfield, California	Brett Thompson
October 23	NAPA 150 Presented by So Cal Pipe Trades	Irwindale Speedway	Irwindale, California	Austin Cameron

== Full Drivers' Championship ==
(key) Bold – Pole position awarded by time. Italics – Pole position set by owner's points. * – Most laps led.

Pos	Driver	PHO	MMR	CAL	S99	EVG	IRW	S99	RMR	DCS	PHO	CNS	MMR	IRW	Pts
1	Mike Duncan	10	**2***	8	**2***	3	**4***	**2**	4	**3***	**19**	1	**5***	9	2090
2	Austin Cameron	2	12	13	1	1*	1	17	1	6	7	2	4	1*	2074
3	David Gilliland	11	1	6	3	**6**	20	15	5	2	5	5	18	4	1915
4	Scott Gaylord	7	4	4	20	5	3	4	13	4	2	15	13	5	1900
5	Scott Lynch	27	3	3	10	7	23	21	2*	1	1*	**12**	9	**7**	1877
6	Mike David	4	5	9	8	20	9	1*	3	8	6		2	6	1803
7	Daryl Harr	19	8	14	9	13	14	6	9	9	8	7	8	20	1711
8	Carl Harr	14	9	21	17	11	15	7	12	10	10	14	7	10	1666
9	Tim Woods	6	13	19	19	19	2	14	22	13	9	13	10	8	1642
10	José Luis Ramírez	16	16	10	6	24	16	19	20	11	13	11	19	16	1534
11	Gene Woods	20	17	20	11	21	11	8	8	12	27	10	16	19	1526
12	Nick DeFazio	15	7	24	22	15	8	18	19	15	22	6	23	14	1507
13	Jack Sellers	24	22	25	16	16	19	10	16	17	12	18	15	21	1427
14	Sean Woodside		23	26	13	12	24	16	7	16	20	8	3	15	1425
15	Bobby Hillis Jr.	25	19	17	18	23	22	11	17	18	11	19	DNQ	23	1375
16	Brett Thompson	13		7		22	26		11	5	4	17	1	3	1359
17	Kerry Earnhardt					4	7	20	6	7		4*	21	13	1099
18	David Eshleman	17	18	16	15	17	21	12	15		17				1023
19	Tim Smith				5	14		3					6	11	721
20	C. T. Hellmund	12			4		13		21			3			676
21	Johnny Borneman III	29		18*			5				3			25	618
22	Steve Schaefer	22	14	23			18			14					542
23	Nick Joanides			29							16	9	20	24	523
24	David Cardey		11			DNQ	25				15		24		515
25	Takuma Koga	23				DNQ	DNQ						11	22	482
26	John Moore		15		7			5							419
27	Rick Craig								18		18	16	DNQ		418
28	Ken Schrader	1*		1											365
29	Jason Jefferson			15		10	DNQ						17		364
30	Brandon Miller			Wth			6							12	350
31	Jason Small		6	27			DNQ						22		329
32	Clint Bowyer	8		**2**											322
33	Brian Richardson	18	24		21										300
34	P. J. Abbott				DNQ		DNQ	13							291
35	John Salemi					DNQ	17							26	282
36	Trevor Montgomery				14	9									259
37	Dale Quarterley	26												2	255
38	Tony Gomez		10				DNQ				14				255
39	Buzz DeVore				DNQ			9							232
40	Kristi Schmitt									19			14		227
41	Wheeler Boys								14		23				215
42	Eddy McKean								**10**		28				213
43	Jeff Davis	28					12								206
44	Chris Oddo						DNQ							17	194
45	Freddy Tame	21									26				185
46	Jeff Jefferson					2									170
47	Matt Kobyluck	3													165
48	Jim Inglebright	5													155
49	Kevin Conway			5											155
50	Doug Ingraham	30		28											153
51	Ed Watson					8									142
52	Brandon Ash	9													138
53	Tony Bruncati						10								134
54	Eric Norris			11											130
55	Rick Ruzbarsky												12		127
56	J. R. Patton			12											127
57	Troy Shirk				12										127
58	Mara Reyes													18	109
59	Gary Smith					18									109
60	Carson Woods Jr.		20												103
61	Dennis Hannel		21												100
62	Sarah Fisher										21				100
63	Blake Mallory			22											97
64	Michael Lewis										24				91
65	Mike Boat		DNQ												88
66	Rafael Martinz										25				88
67	Ruben Garcia Novoa													DNQ	82
68	Carlos Pardo													DNQ	79
69	Jorge Goeters													DNQ	76

== See also ==
- 2004 NASCAR Nextel Cup Series
- 2004 NASCAR Busch Series
- 2004 NASCAR Craftsman Truck Series
- 2004 ARCA Re/Max Series
