= Scott Ivie =

American racing driver (born 1971)

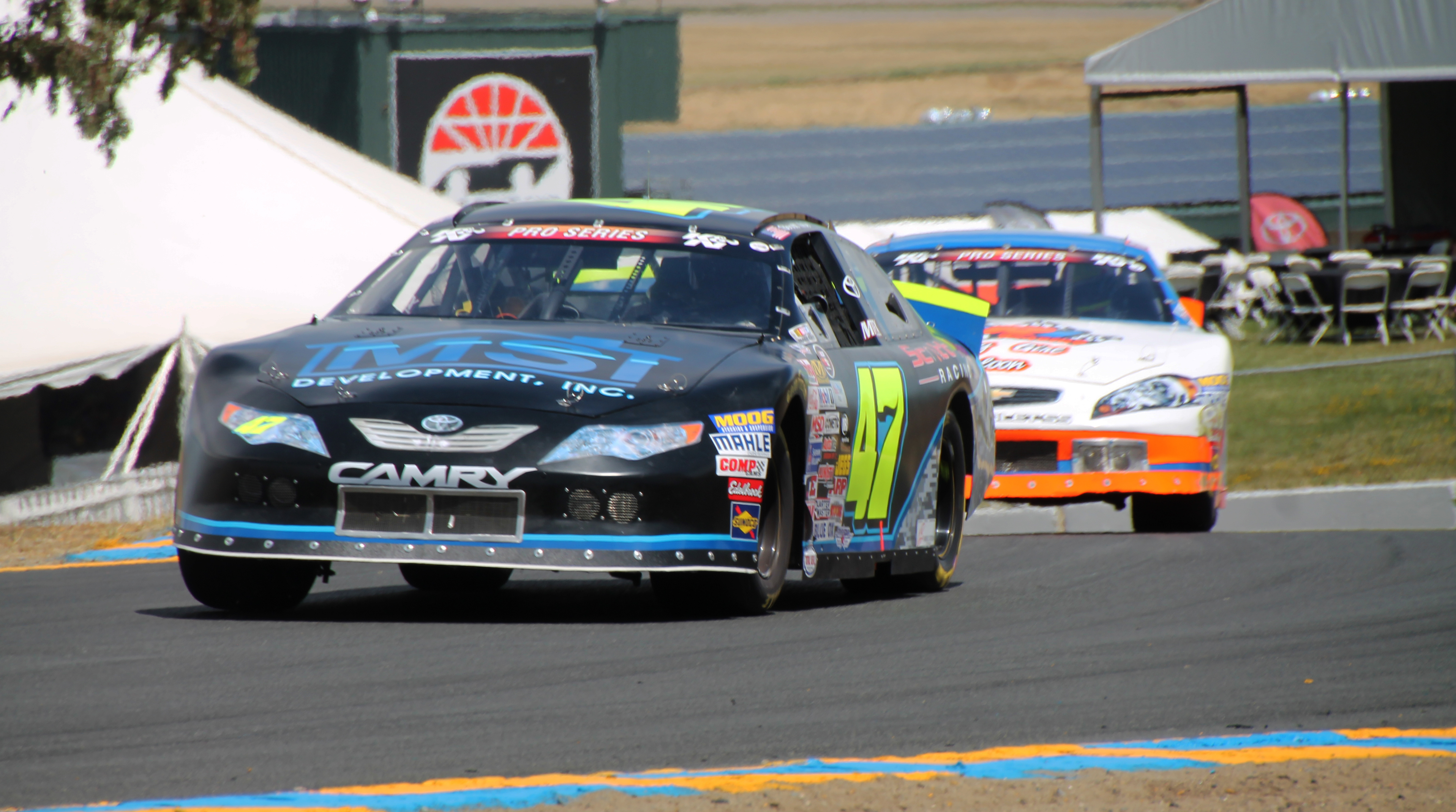
- Ivie's No. 47 car at Sonoma Raceway in 2015
- Born: February 7, 1971 (age 55); San Ramon, California, U.S.

ARCA Menards Series West career
- 28 races run over 11 years
- Best finish: 23rd (2013), (2014)
- First race: 2007 Blue Lizard Suncream 200 (Sonoma)
- Last race: 2017 Carneros 200 (Sonoma)
Wins	Top tens	Poles
0	2	0
- Statistics up to date as of November 23, 2024.

Scott Ivie (born February 7, 1971) is an American professional stock car racing driver who competed in the NASCAR K&N Pro Series West from 2007 to 2018.

Ivie has also competed in the NASCAR Southwest Series.

== Motorsports results ==
=== NASCAR ===
(key) (Bold - Pole position awarded by qualifying time. Italics - Pole position earned by points standings or practice time. * – Most laps led.)

==== K&N Pro Series West ====
NASCAR K&N Pro Series West results
Year	Team	No.	Make	1	2	3	4	5	6	7	8	9	10	11	12	13	14	15	NKNPSWC	Pts	Ref
2007	Dick Midgley	09	Chevy	CTS	PHO	AMP	ELK	IOW	CNS	SON; 36	DCS	IRW	MMP	EVG	CSR	AMP			78th	55	
2008	Scott Ivie	74	Ford	AAS	PHO	CTS	IOW	CNS	SON; 13	IRW	DCS	EVG	MMP	IRW	AMP	AAS			57th	124	
2009	Scott Ivie	74	Ford	CTS	AAS	PHO	MAD	IOW	DCS	SON	IRW	PIR; 26	MMP; 11	CNS	IOW	AAS			36th	255	
2010	Scott Ivie	74	Ford	AAS	PHO	IOW	DCS	SON; 12	IRW	PIR; 27	MRP	CNS	MMP; 26	AAS	PHO				36th	294	
2011	Scott Ivie	74	Ford	PHO	AAS	MMP; 31	IOW	LVS	SON; 18	IRW	EVG	PIR; 21	CNS	MRP	SPO	AAS	PHO		47th	279	
2012	Michelle Ivie	47	Toyota	PHO	LHC	MMP; 6	S99	IOW	BIR	LVS									31st	89	
2012	Michelle Ivie	47	Ford								SON; 24	EVG	CNS	IOW	PIR; 13	SMP	AAS	PHO	31st	89	
2013	Michelle Ivie	47	Toyota	PHO; 16	S99	BIR	IOW	L44										PHO; 20	23rd	121	
2013	Michelle Ivie	47	Ford						SON; 31	CNS	IOW	EVG	SRP	MMP; 13	SMP	AAS	KCR; 19		23rd	121	
2014	Michelle Ivie	47	Toyota	PHO	IRW; 20	S99	IOW	KCR; 15											23rd	113	
2014	Michelle Ivie	47	Ford						SON; 17	SLS	CNS	IOW	EVG	KCR	MMP; 11	AAS	PHO		23rd	113	
2015	Michelle Ivie	47	Ford	KCR; 23	IRW	TUS	IOW	SHA											55th	30	
2015	Michelle Ivie	47	Toyota						SON; 35	SLS	IOW	EVG	CNS	MER	AAS	PHO			55th	30	
2016	Michelle Ivie	47	Toyota	IRW	KCR	TUS	OSS	CNS	SON; 8	SLS	IOW	EVG	DCS	MMP; 15	MMP; 13	MER	AAS		25th	96	
2017	Michelle Ivie	47	Toyota	TUS	KCR	IRW	IRW	SPO	OSS	CNS	SON; 16	IOW	EVG	DCS	MER	AAS	KCR		53rd	28	
