= Rafael Martínez (racing driver) =

Mexican racing driver

- Born: March 3, 1962 (age 64); Monterrey, Mexico

NASCAR O'Reilly Auto Parts Series career
- 2 races run over 2 years
- Best finish: 117th (2008)
- First race: 2005 Telcel-Motorola Mexico 200 (Mexico City)
- Last race: 2008 Corona Mexico 200 (Mexico City)
Wins	Top tens	Poles
0	0	0

ARCA Menards Series West career
- 1 race run over 1 year
- Best finish: 66th (2004)
- First race: 2004 Subway 150 (Phoenix)
Wins	Top tens	Poles
0	0	0
- Statistics up to date as of January 16, 2025.

Rafael Martínez (born March 3, 1962) is a Mexican professional auto racing driver who has competed in the NASCAR Nationwide Series and the NASCAR West Series. He is a former champion of the NASCAR Mexico Series, having won the championship in 2007; he is also the oldest driver to win the championship in that series, having won it at the age of 45 years old.

== Motorsports results ==
=== NASCAR ===
(key) (Bold - Pole position awarded by qualifying time. Italics - Pole position earned by points standings or practice time. * – Most laps led.)

==== Nationwide Series ====
NASCAR Nationwide Series results
Year	Team	No.	Make	1	2	3	4	5	6	7	8	9	10	11	12	13	14	15	16	17	18	19	20	21	22	23	24	25	26	27	28	29	30	31	32	33	34	35	NNSC	Pts	Ref
2005	Davis Motorsports	0	Chevy	DAY	CAL	MXC; 43	LVS	ATL	NSH	BRI	TEX	PHO	TAL	DAR	RCH	CLT	DOV	NSH	KEN	MLW	DAY	CHI	NHA	PPR	GTY	IRP	GLN	MCH	BRI	CAL	RCH	DOV	KAN	CLT	MEM	TEX	PHO	HOM	144th	34	
2008	Baker Curb Racing	37	Ford	DAY	CAL	LVS	ATL	BRI	NSH	TEX	PHO	MXC; 20	TAL	RCH	DAR	CLT	DOV	NSH	KEN	MLW	NHA	DAY	CHI	GTY	IRP	CGV	GLN	MCH	BRI	CAL	RCH	DOV	KAN	CLT	MEM	TEX	PHO	HOM	117th	103	

==== West Series ====
NASCAR West Series results
Year	Team	No.	Make	1	2	3	4	5	6	7	8	9	10	11	12	13	NWSC	Pts	Ref
2004	C. T. Hellmund	39	Chevy	PHO	MMR	CAL	S99	EVG	IRW	S99	RMR	DCS	PHO; 25	CNS	MMR	IRW	66th	88	
