= 2012 NASCAR K&N Pro Series West =

59th season of the NASCAR K&N Pro Series West

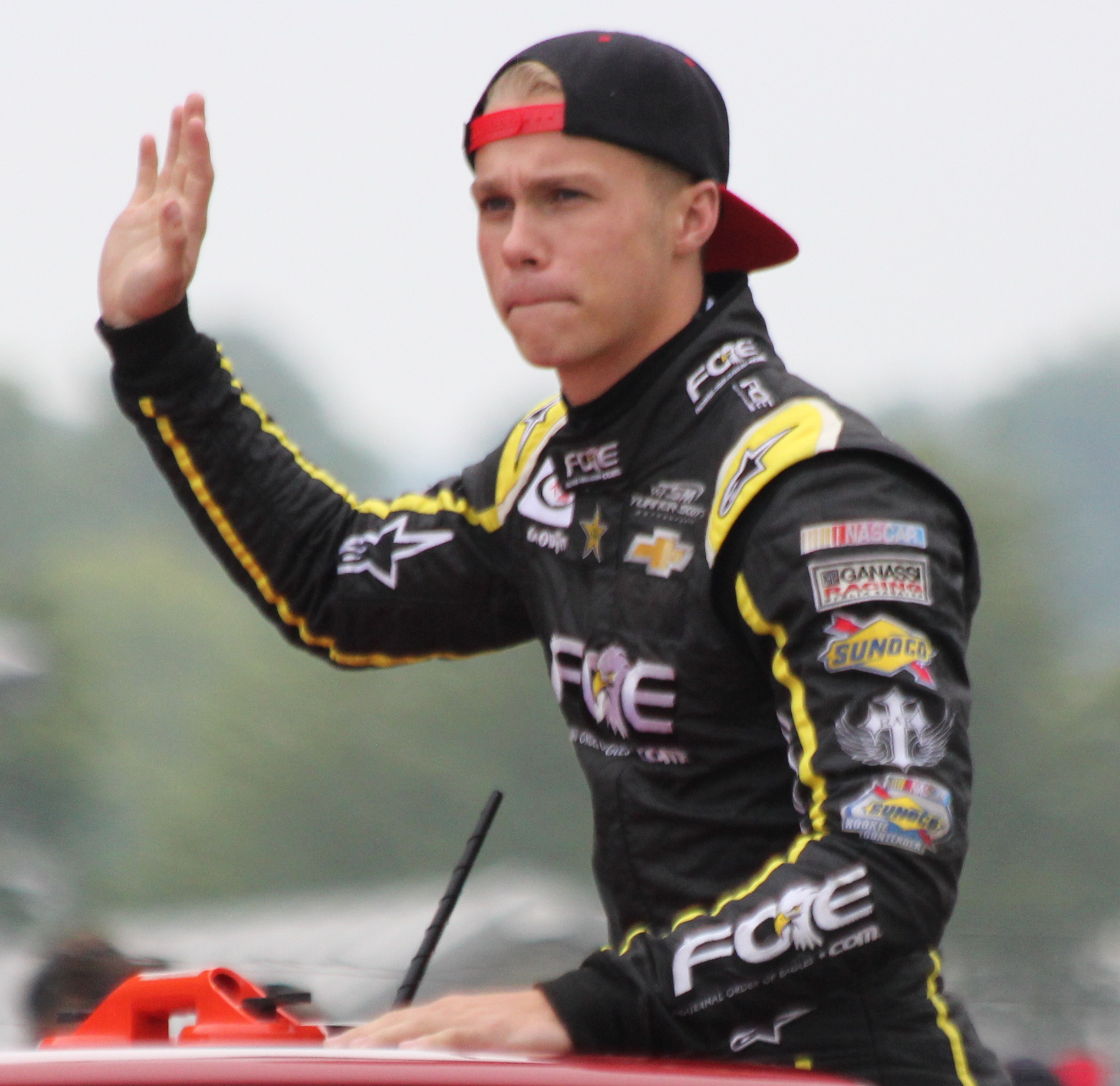
Dylan Kwasniewski, the 2012 NASCAR K&N Pro Series West champion

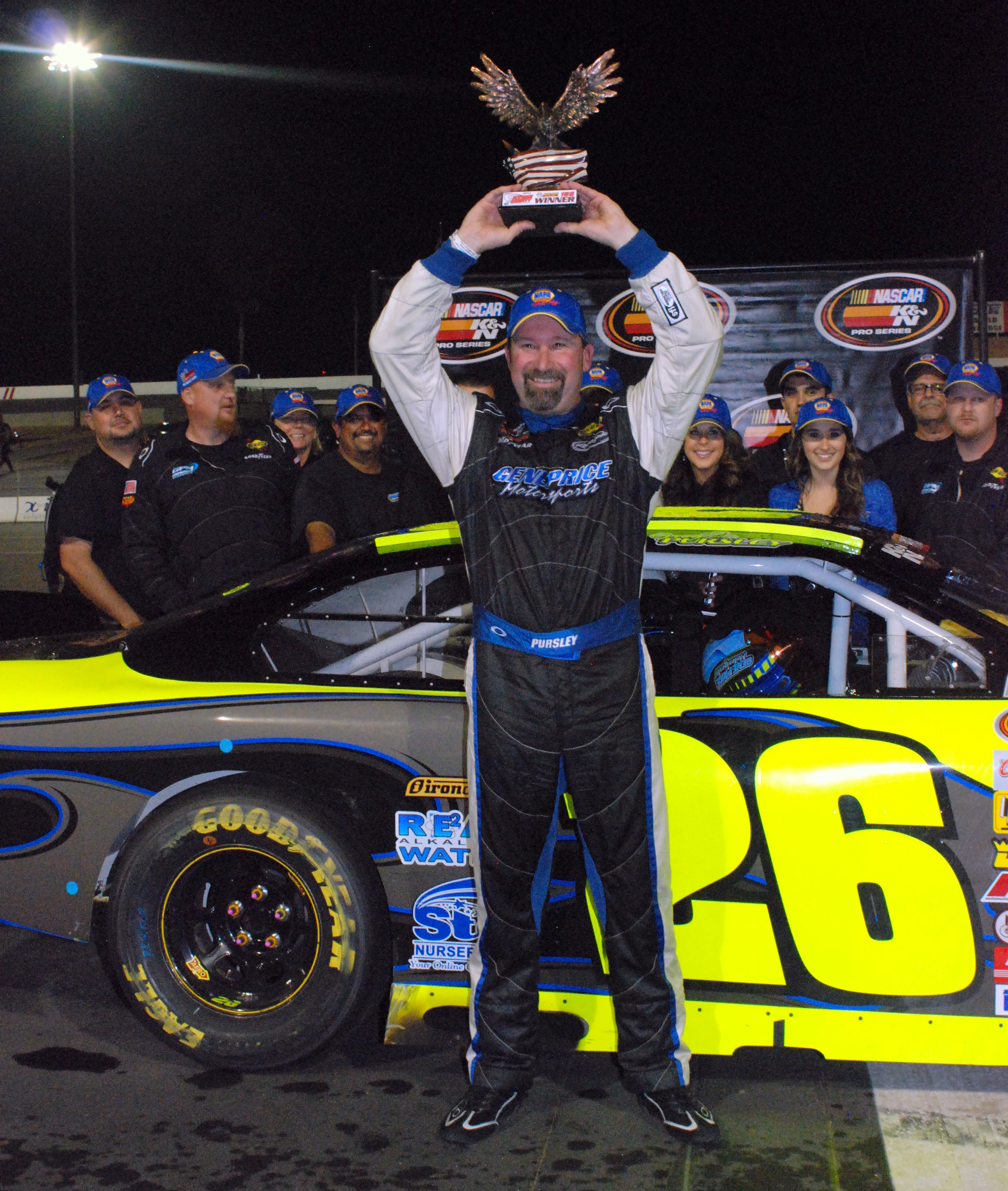
Greg Pursley finished second behind Kwasniewski in the championship by 6 points

The 2012 NASCAR K&N Pro Series West was the 59th season of the NASCAR K&N Pro Series West, a regional stock car racing series sanctioned by NASCAR. It began with the Talking Stick Resort 50 at Phoenix International Raceway on March 3, 2012, and concluded with the Casino Arizona 50 at the same track on November 10, 2012. Dylan Kwasniewski won the championship, six points ahead of Greg Pursley.

== Schedule and results ==
The 2012 season included 15 individual races, although Phoenix International Raceway and Iowa Speedway hosted two races each. The races at Iowa were in combination with the NASCAR K&N Pro Series East.

Date	Name	Racetrack	Location	Winner
March 3	Talking Stick Resort 50	Phoenix International Raceway	Avondale, Arizona	David Mayhew
April 14	Toyota / NAPA 150 Pres. by Gene Price Motorsports	Havasu 95 Speedway	Lake Havasu City, Arizona	Derek Thorn
April 28	Utah Grand Prix	Miller Motorsports Park	Tooele, Utah	Greg Pursley
May 5	Pick-N-Pull 150	Stockton 99 Speedway	Stockton, California	Dylan Kwasniewski
May 19	Graham Tire 150	Iowa Speedway	Newton, Iowa	Chase Elliott
May 26	Street Car Showdown	Brainerd International Raceway	Brainerd, Minnesota	Michael Self
June 2	Star Nursery 200	The Bullring at Las Vegas Motor Speedway	Las Vegas, Nevada	Greg Pursley
June 23	Pick-N-Pull Racing To Stop Hunger 200	Sonoma Raceway	Sonoma, California	David Gilliland
July 14	NAPA Auto Parts 150	Evergreen Speedway	Monroe, Washington	Eric Holmes
July 28	NAPA / Toyota 150	Colorado National Speedway	Erie, Colorado	Greg Pursley
August 3	Pork Be Inspired 150	Iowa Speedway	Newton, Iowa	Corey LaJoie
August 26	NAPA Auto Parts Salute to the Troops 125	Portland International Raceway	Portland, Oregon	Greg Pursley
September 29	NAPA Auto Parts 150	NAPA Speedway	Albuquerque, New Mexico	Derek Thorn
October 13	Toyota / NAPA Auto Parts 150	All American Speedway	Roseville, California	Dylan Kwasniewski
November 10	Casino Arizona 50	Phoenix International Raceway	Avondale, Arizona	Michael Self

== Full Drivers' Championship ==
(key) Bold – Pole position awarded by time. Italics – Pole position set by owner's points. * – Most laps led.

Pos	Driver	PHO	LHC	MMP	S99	IOW	BIR	LVS	SON	EVG	CNS	IOW	PIR	SMP	AAS	PHO	Pts
1	Dylan Kwasniewski	2	3	4	**1***	1 (Note: Finished 8th overall)	2*	**2**	5	7	**5**	9 (Note: Finished 27th overall)	4	**9***	**1**	2	622
2	Greg Pursley	4	10	**1***	4	2 (Note: Finished 9th overall)	3	1*	**3***	**6**	1*	5 (Note: Finished 20th overall)	**1***	8	13	6	616
3	Derek Thorn	5	**1***	12	7	5 (Note: Finished 24th overall)	4	14	2	3	2	10 (Note: Finished 29th overall)	5	1	4	27	568
4	Eric Holmes	8	5	2	2	9 (Note: Finished 33rd overall)	6	19	23	1*	7	3 (Note: Finished 18th overall)	3	3	2*	20	557
5	David Mayhew	**1***	2	9	3	10 (Note: Finished 34th overall)	5	4	9	5	8	4 (Note: Finished 19th overall)	6		3	7	548
6	Michael Self	18	4	18	20	4 (Note: Finished 17th overall)	1	17	6	2	4	1 (Note: Finished 9th overall)	2	12	22	1*	541
7	Cameron Hayley	22	6	8	14	6 (Note: Finished 25th overall)	12	5	10	19	3	2 (Note: Finished 12th overall)	22	15	5	5	493
8	Austin Dyne		7	3*	8	8 (Note: Finished 29th overall)	8	7	13	13	12	12 (Note: Finished 36th overall)	10	5	12	13	487
9	Jonathon Gomez	24	13	15	6	3 (Note: Finished 13th overall)	7	3	7	4	15	7 (Note: Finished 23rd overall)	12		10	12	478
10	Ryan Philpott	16	17	16	23	DNQ	14	10	14	9	22	6 (Note: Finished 22nd overall)	21	21	21	17	420
11	Carl Harr	20	14	10	16	DNQ	10	11		10	11	8 (Note: Finished 26th overall)	26	10	16	24	412
12	Daryl Harr	13	11	21	12	7 (Note: Finished 28th overall)	11	20		8	21	DNQ	23	19	17	19	400
13	John Wood	26	18	13	18	DNQ	15	22	22	22	14	DNQ	19	13	18	26	378
14	Dylan Hutchison	23	12	22	11	DNQ	9	8	28	17	20		30		20		316
15	Travis Milburn	14	19	26	15			16	11		13		25		7	23	272
16	Braeden Havens		8		13			12		11	10			7	11	15	265
17	Jack Sellers	29	20	24	21	DNQ	16	13	27	18	23		29				245
18	Taylor Cuzick			14		DNQ		9		14	18			4		14	224
19	Brett Thompson	12		20		DNQ	13					DNQ	11			9	216
20	Ron Jay		21		10	DNQ	18	26						14		DNQ	170
21	Billy Kann	27	DNQ					25			16			17		22	133
22	Cassie Gannis	DNQ	15	23	19			24								21	130
23	Anthony Giannone						19			21	19			16		18	127
24	Josh Reaume			25		DNQ				15			18			DNQ	115
25	Dallas Montes													2	8	11	111
26	Chris Evans					DNQ	17		19				16				109
27	Ben Kennedy	11									9					10	102
28	Brian Wong			11									7	16			98
29	Jessie Brunelli				9			15	12								96
30	Austin Cameron			5					8				28				91
31	Scott Ivie			6					24				13				89
32	Tommy Regan				22				21						19	25	89
33	David Gilliland	9							1								82
34	Justin Funkhouser	28	22	27	17												82
35	Jason Fensler				5			23							23		81
36	Jim Inglebright								4				9				75
37	Zack Huffman									20	17		27				68
38	Chase Elliott	17														4	67
39	Kelly Admiraal													11	DNQ	28	67
40	Ryan Partridge		9												14		65
41	Brennan Newberry	15										11 (Note: Finished 35th overall)					62
42	Kyle Kelley			19									15				54
43	Mike Haslam							18		16							54
44	Hannah Newhouse													6	DNQ		53
45	Kyle Heckman			7					29								52
46	Isaac Sherman	19												18			51
47	Tim Spurgeon								25				17				46
48	Robbie Brand		16												DNQ		45
49	Daniel Graeff								20		24						44
50	Jack Clarke													20	DNQ		43
51	Johnny Borneman III	30							30							29	43
52	Daniel Suárez	3															41
53	Cale Conley															**3**	41
54	Carlos Iaconelli	6															38
55	Tim Bell							6									38
56	Michael Waltrip										6						38
57	Jamie Krzysik														6		38
58	Chad Boat	7															37
59	Dale Quarterley												8				36
60	Bryan Ortiz															8	36
61	Mike David														9		35
62	D. J. Kennington	10															34
63	Justin Philpott									12							32
64	Bobby Hillis Jr.	DNQ								23							32
65	Tom Klauer												14				30
66	Griffin Steinfeld														DNQ	30	30
67	Eric Norris								15								29
68	Chase Miller											DNQ					29
69	Markus Niemelä														15		29
70	Stan Silva Jr.								16								28
71	Mike Skeen			17													27
72	Carlos Vieira								17								27
73	Hershel McGriff								18								26
74	Eddie Nakato												20				24
75	Brady Flaherty	21															23
76	Ali Jackson							21									23
77	Sean Guthrie													22			22
78	Johnny White		DNQ														21
79	Jacob Gomes				24												20
80	Mike Olsen												24				20
81	Julien Jousse														24		20
82	Trevor Cristiani	25															19
83	Juan Pitta		DNQ														19
84	Dave Smith								26								18
85	Patrick Long			DNQ													16
86	Rodd Kneeland														DNQ		14
87	Jack Chisholm	DNQ															13

== See also ==
- 2012 NASCAR Sprint Cup Series
- 2012 NASCAR Nationwide Series
- 2012 NASCAR Camping World Truck Series
- 2012 ARCA Racing Series
- 2012 NASCAR K&N Pro Series East
- 2012 NASCAR Whelen Modified Tour
- 2012 NASCAR Whelen Southern Modified Tour
- 2012 NASCAR Canadian Tire Series
- 2012 NASCAR Toyota Series
- 2012 NASCAR Stock V6 Series
