= Carl Harr =

Canadian racing driver (born 1953)

- Born: September 9, 1953 (age 73); St. Albert, Alberta, British Columbia, Canada

ARCA Menards Series West career
- 78 races run over 11 years
- Best finish: 8th (2004), (2013)
- First race: 2001 NAPA 300 (Las Vegas Bullring)
- Last race: 2014 NAPA Auto Parts 150 (Irwindale)
Wins	Top tens	Poles
0	20	0
- Statistics up to date as of November 15, 2024.

Carl Harr (born September 9, 1953) is a Canadian former professional stock car racing driver and who competed in the NASCAR K&N Pro Series West and the NASCAR Canadian Tire Series. He is the son of fellow former racing driver Daryl Harr, who has also previously competed in the West Series and Canada Series, as well as the NASCAR Nationwide Series.

Harr has also previously competed in the Copper World Classic.

== Motorsports results ==
=== NASCAR ===
(key) (Bold - Pole position awarded by qualifying time. Italics - Pole position earned by points standings or practice time. * – Most laps led.)

==== K&N Pro Series East ====
NASCAR K&N Pro Series East results
Year	Team	No.	Make	1	2	3	4	5	6	7	8	9	10	11	12	13	14	NKNPSEC	Pts	Ref
2011	Harr Racing	2	Chevy	GRE	SBO	RCH	IOW; DNQ	BGS	JFC	LGY	NHA	COL	GRE	NHA	DOV			N/A	0	
2012	Harr Racing	71	Chevy	BRI	GRE	RCH	IOW; DNQ	BGS	JFC	LGY	CNB	COL	IOW	NHA	DOV	GRE	CAR	N/A	0	

==== K&N Pro Series West ====
NASCAR K&N Pro Series West results
Year	Team	No.	Make	1	2	3	4	5	6	7	8	9	10	11	12	13	14	15	NKNPSWC	Pts	Ref
2001	WestWorld Motorsports	02	Chevy	PHO	LVS; 13	TUS	MMR	CAL	IRW	LAG	KAN	EVG	CNS	IRW	RMR	LVS	IRW		49th	124	
2002	WestWorld Motorsports	02	Chevy	PHO; 16	LVS; 18	CAL	KAN; 13	EVG	IRW	S99	RMR; 11	DCS	LVS; 17						16th	590	
2003	WestWorld Motorsports	02	Chevy	PHO; 19	LVS; 18	CAL; 23	MAD	TCR	EVG; 15	IRW	S99	RMR; 20	DCS	PHO; 16	MMR				19th	650	
2004	WestWorld Motorsports	02	Chevy	PHO; 14	MMR; 9	CAL; 21	S99; 17	EVG; 11	IRW; 15	S99; 7	RMR; 12	DCS; 10	PHO; 10	CNS; 14	MMR; 7	IRW; 10			8th	1666	
2005	WestWorld Motorsports	02	Chevy	PHO; 24	MMR; 19	PHO; 22	S99; 17	IRW	EVG	S99	PPR	CAL	DCS	CTS	MMR				26th	406	
2006	WestWorld Motorsports	71	Chevy	PHO; 25	PHO; 19	S99; 7	IRW												24th	431	
2006	WestWorld Motorsports	02	Chevy					SON; 24	DCS	IRW	EVG	S99	CAL	CTS	AMP				24th	431	
2010	Harr Racing	71	Chevy	AAS	PHO; 26	IOW	DCS	SON	IRW	PIR	MRP; 20	CNS			PHO; 34				33rd	322	
2010	Harr Racing	2	Chevy										MMP; DNQ	AAS					33rd	322	
2011	Harr Racing	2	Chevy	PHO; 24	AAS; DNQ	MMP; 9													10th	1532	
2011	Harr Racing	71	Chevy				IOW; DNQ	LVS; 14	SON; 17	IRW; 22	EVG; 16	PIR; 28	CNS; 14	MRP; 9	SPO; 9	AAS; 21	PHO; 20		10th	1532	
2012	Harr Racing	2	Chevy	PHO; 20	LHC; 14	MMP; 10	S99; 16		BIR; 10	LVS; 11	SON	EVG; 10	CNS; 11		PIR; 26	SMP; 10	AAS; 16	PHO; 24	11th	412	
2012	Harr Racing	71	Chevy					IOW; DNQ											11th	412	
2012	Harr Racing	72	Chevy											IOW; 8					11th	412	
2013	Harr Racing	2	Chevy	PHO; 13	S99; 11	BIR; 12		L44; 11	SON; 12	CNS; 14		EVG; 5	SPO; 20	MMP; 10	SMP; 9*	AAS; 18	KCR; 20	PHO; 25	8th	463	
2013	Harr Racing	02	Chevy				IOW; 10				IOW; 9								8th	463	
2014	Harr Racing	2	Chevy	PHO; 16	IRW; 19	S99	IOW	KCR	SON	SLS	CNS	IOW	EVG	KCR	MMP	AAS	PHO		43rd	53	
