= Jonathon Gomez =

American racing driver (born 1983)

- Born: January 4, 1983 (age 43); Twin Falls, Idaho, U.S.

ARCA Menards Series career
- 2 races run over 1 year
- Best finish: 62nd (2009)
- First race: 2009 Ansell Cut Protection 150 (Chicagoland)
- Last race: 2009 ARCA Re/Max American 200 (Rockingham)
Wins	Top tens	Poles
0	0	0

ARCA Menards Series East career
- 1 race run over 1 year
- Best finish: 59th (2009)
- First race: 2009 Sunoco 150 (Dover)
Wins	Top tens	Poles
0	0	0

ARCA Menards Series West career
- 41 races run over 5 years
- Best finish: 6th (2010)
- First race: 2008 Toyota / Bi-Mart 150 by NAPA (Douglas County)
- Last race: 2012 Casino Arizona 50 (Phoenix)
Wins	Top tens	Poles
0	18	0
- Statistics up to date as of November 16, 2024.

Jonathon Gomez (born January 4, 1983) is an American professional stock car racing driver and who has competed in the NASCAR K&N Pro Series East, the NASCAR K&N Pro Series West, and the ARCA Re/Max Series.

Gomez has also previously competed in series such as the SRL Spears Southwest Tour Series, the Northwest Super Late Model Series, the Rocky Mountain Challenge Series, the Speed Tour Super Late Models Series, and the Pro Trucks Series.

== Motorsports results ==
=== NASCAR ===
(key) (Bold - Pole position awarded by qualifying time. Italics - Pole position earned by points standings or practice time. * – Most laps led.)

==== Camping World East Series ====
NASCAR Camping World East Series results
Year	Team	No.	Make	1	2	3	4	5	6	7	8	9	10	11	NCWESC	Pts	Ref
2009	Thompson Motorsports	60	Chevy	GRE	TRI	IOW	SBO	GLN	NHA	TMP	ADI	LRP	NHA	DOV; 26	59th	85	

==== K&N Pro Series West ====
NASCAR K&N Pro Series West results
Year	Team	No.	Make	1	2	3	4	5	6	7	8	9	10	11	12	13	14	15	NKNPSWC	Pts	Ref
2008	Rob Dixon	36	Chevy	AAS	PHO	CTS	IOW	CNS	SON	IRW	DCS; 9	EVG; 8	MMP	IRW	AMP	AAS			34th	280	
2009	Rob Dixon	34	Chevy	CTS; 8	AAS; 12	PHO; 19	MAD; 11												17th	765	
2009	Thompson Motorsports	60	Chevy					IOW; 11	DCS	SON	IRW	PIR	MMP	CNS	IOW; 11	AAS			17th	765	
2010	John Gomez	22	Chevy	AAS; 23	PHO; 4	IOW; 2	DCS; 10	SON; 11	IRW; 6	PIR; 12	MRP; 4	CNS; 13	MMP; 21	AAS; 7	PHO; 11				6th	1630	
2011	John Gomez	22	Chevy	PHO; 2	AAS; 20		IOW; 14	LVS; 25	SON	IRW	EVG	PIR	CNS	MRP			PHO; 38		17th	838	
2011	John Gomez	22	Toyota			MMP; 4									SPO; 8	AAS			17th	838	
2012	John Gomez	22	Chevy	PHO; 24	LHC; 13	MMP; 15	S99; 6	IOW; 3	BIR; 7	LVS; 3	SON; 7	EVG; 4	CNS; 15	IOW; 7	PIR; 21	SMP	AAS; 10		9th	478	
2012	John Gomez	16	Chevy															PHO; 12	9th	478	

=== ARCA Re/Max Series ===
(key) (Bold – Pole position awarded by qualifying time. Italics – Pole position earned by points standings or practice time. * – Most laps led.)

ARCA Re/Max Series results
Year	Team	No.	Make	1	2	3	4	5	6	7	8	9	10	11	12	13	14	15	16	17	18	19	20	21	ARMC	Pts	Ref
2009	Capital City Motorsports	38	Dodge	DAY	SLM	CAR	TAL	KEN	TOL	POC	MCH	MFD	IOW	KEN	BLN	POC	ISF	CHI; 24	TOL	DSF	NJE	SLM	KAN	CAR; 20	62nd	490	
