= Mike David =

American racing driver (born 1967)

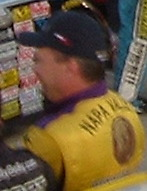
- David at Thunder Hill Raceway in 2008
- Born: Michael David; January 29, 1967 (age 59); Modesto, California, U.S.

ARCA Menards Series West career
- 91 races run over 10 years
- Best finish: 1st (2007)
- First race: 2001 Foods Co. 200 (Mesa Marin)
- Last race: 2012 Toyota / NAPA Auto Parts 150 (Roseville)
- First win: 2004 Dodge Country / Havoline / NAPA 200 (Stockton)
- Last win: 2008 Jimmie Johnson Foundation 150 (Phoenix)
Wins	Top tens	Poles
6	64	3
- Statistics up to date as of November 13, 2025.

Michael David (born January 29, 1967) is an American former professional stock car racing driver and crew chief who competed in the NASCAR K&N Pro Series West from 2001 to 2012. David is a former champion of the series, having won the championship in 2007.

David has previously competed in series such as the SRL Spears Southwest Tour Series, the NASCAR Southwest Series, the Shell Tri-Track Challenge, and the Pacific Challenge Series.

== Motorsports results ==
=== NASCAR ===
(key) (Bold - Pole position awarded by qualifying time. Italics - Pole position earned by points standings or practice time. * – Most laps led.)

==== K&N Pro Series West ====
NASCAR K&N Pro Series West results
Year	Team	No.	Make	1	2	3	4	5	6	7	8	9	10	11	12	13	14	15	NKNPSWC	Pts	Ref
1999	Unknown	9	Chevy	TUS; DNQ	LVS	PHO	CAL	PPR	MMR	IRW	EVG	POR	IRW	RMR	LVS	MMR	MOT		97th	0	
2001	Randy Lynch	5	Ford	PHO	LVS	TUS	MMR; 19	CAL	IRW; 14	LAG	KAN; 10	EVG	CNS	IRW; 4	RMR	LVS; 5	IRW		20th	676	
2002	Randy Lynch	5	Ford	PHO; 11	LVS; 4	CAL; 20													7th	1383	
2002	Randy Lynch	2	Ford				KAN; 5	EVG; 5	IRW; 7	S99; 3	RMR; 6	DCS; 13	LVS; 26						7th	1383	
2003	Randy Lynch	2	Ford	PHO	LVS	CAL; 21	MAD; 2	TCR	EVG	IRW; 3	S99; 3	RMR	DCS; 21	PHO; 8	MMR				17th	852	
2004	Randy Lynch	2	Ford	PHO; 4	MMR; 5	CAL; 9	S99; 8	EVG; 20	IRW; 9	S99; 1*	RMR; 3	DCS; 8	PHO; 6	CNS	MMR; 2	IRW; 6			6th	1803	
2005	Randy Lynch	2	Ford	PHO; 4	MMR; 4	PHO; 16	S99; 3	IRW; 16	EVG; 6	S99; 10	PPR; 7	CAL; 8	DCS; 11	CTS; 5	MMR; 1				5th	1757	
2006	Randy Lynch	2	Ford	PHO; 14	PHO; 3	S99; 1*	IRW; 6	SON; 29	DCS; 2	IRW; 5	EVG; 8	S99; 1	CAL; 9	**CTS**; 5*	AMP; 13				2nd	1806	
2007	Randy Lynch	2	Ford	CTS; 2	PHO; 3	AMP; 1	ELK; 1	IOW; 13	CNS; 2	SON; 24	**DCS**; 15*	IRW; 5	**MMP**; 3*	EVG; 3	CSR; 11	AMP; 3			1st	2013	
2008	Randy Lynch	2	Ford	AAS; 3		CTS; 7			SON; 9		DCS; 17	EVG; 11	MMP; 2						4th	1919	
2008	Randy Lynch	2	Toyota		PHO; 1		IOW; 4	CNS; 2		IRW; 11				IRW; 14	AMP; 17	AAS; 2			4th	1919	
2009	Randy Lynch	2	Toyota	CTS; 7	AAS; 7	PHO; 4	MAD; 3	IOW; 6	DCS; 4										14th	1060	
2009	Randy Lynch	2	Ford							SON; 15	IRW	PIR	MMP	CNS	IOW	AAS			14th	1060	
2012	Carlos Vieira	51	Toyota	PHO	LHC	MMP	S99	IOW	BIR	LVS	SON	EVG	CNS	IOW	PIR	SMP	AAS; 9	PHO	61st	35	
