= Legendary Billy Green 150 =

ARCA Menards Series West race at Colorado National Speedway

ARCA Menards Series West
- Venue: Colorado National Speedway
- Location: Dacono, Colorado
- First race: 1995
- Laps: 150
- Previous names: Mistic Premium Beverages 200 (1995); Snap-On 200 (1996); NAPA 250 (2001); NAPA 150 (2004, 2007); Toyota / NAPA 150 (2008–2009); Toyota / NAPA Auto Parts Bonus Challenge 150 (2010); Toyota / NAPA Auto Parts 150 (2011, 2013–2014); NAPA / Toyota 150 (2012, 2016–2017); NAPA Auto Parts / Toyota 150 (2015); NAPA Auto Parts 175 (2018); NAPA Auto Parts 150 (2019); ENEOS 150 Presented by NAPA Auto Parts (2020); NAPA Auto Parts Colorado 150 (2021); Colorado 150 (2025)
- Most wins (driver): Chris Eggleston (3)
- Most wins (team): Bill McAnally Racing (9)
- Most wins (manufacturer): Toyota; Ford (8)

Circuit information
- Surface: Asphalt
- Length: 90.52 km (56.25 mi)
- Turns: 4

The Legendary Billy Green 150 is an annual ARCA Menards Series West race held at Colorado National Speedway in Dacono, Colorado. Trevor Huddleston is the defending winner of the race.

== History ==
The series started racing at Colorado in 1995. The race has been on and off the series schedule since 1997.

In 2025, it was announced that Colorado would return to the schedule under the Colorado 150. After a successful return, it was announced that the race would return again in May 2026 under a new name, the Legendary Billy Green 150.

== Past winners ==
Year	Date	No.	Driver	Team	Manufacturer	Race Distance		Race Time	Average Speed (mph)	Report	Ref
Year	Date	No.	Driver	Team	Manufacturer	Laps	Miles (km)	Race Time	Average Speed (mph)	Report	Ref
1995	May 20	77	Mike Chase (1)	Steven Sellers (1)	Ford (1)	200	75.000 (120.70)	1:26:08	52.240	Report	
1996	July 13	45	Ron Hornaday Jr. (1)	Spears Motorsports (1)	Chevrolet (1)	200	75.000 (120.70)	1:10:38	63.709	Report	
1997 - 2000	Not held										
2001	July 14	3	Steve Portenga (1)	Portenga Motorsports (1)	Chevrolet (2)	250	93.750 (150.88)	1:25:47	65.572	Report	
2002 - 2003	Not held										
2004	October 9	9	Mike Duncan (1)	MB Duncan Motorsports (1)	Chevrolet (3)	150	56.250 (90.53)	0:54:43	60.859	Report	
2005 - 2006	Not held										
2007	June 2	9	Mike Duncan (2)	MB Duncan Motorsports (2)	Chevrolet (4)	155*	58.125 (93.54)	1:12:02	47.770	Report	
2008	June 7	20	Eric Holmes (1)	Bill McAnally Racing (1)	Toyota (1)	150	56.250 (90.53)	0:53:40	62.888	Report	
2009	August 15	12	Paulie Harraka (1)	Bill McAnally Racing (2)	Toyota (2)	150	56.250 (90.53)	0:53:17	62.496	Report	
2010	August 14	20	Eric Holmes (2)	Bill McAnally Racing (3)	Toyota (3)	150	56.250 (90.53)	0:59:43	56.517	Report	
2011	August 6	03	Dylan Kwasniewski (1)	Gene Price Motorsports (1)	Ford (2)	152*	57.000 (91.73)	0:51:55	65.875	Report	
2012	July 28	26	Greg Pursley (1)	Gene Price Motorsports (2)	Ford (3)	153*	57.375 (92.34)	1:02:38	54.230	Report	
2013	July 27	6	Derek Thorn (1)	Sunrise Ford Racing (1)	Ford (4)	150	56.250 (90.53)	0:50:32	65.897	Report	
2014	July 26	99	Chris Eggleston (1)	Bill McAnally Racing (4)	Toyota (4)	150	56.250 (90.53)	0:52:57	62.890	Report	
2015	August 22	9	Ryan Partridge (1)	Sunrise Ford Racing (2)	Ford (5)	150	56.250 (90.53)	0:50:51	65.487	Report	
2016	June 11	50	Chris Eggleston (2)	Bill McAnally Racing (5)	Toyota (5)	150	56.250 (90.53)	1:05:07	51.139	Report	
2017	June 10	99	Chris Eggleston (3)	Bill McAnally Racing (6)	Toyota (6)	150	56.250 (90.53)	1:10:04	47.526	Report	
2018	June 9	6	Derek Thorn (2)	Sunrise Ford Racing (2)	Ford (6)	175	65.625 (105.61)	0:50:40	76.678	Report	
2019	June 8	19	Hailie Deegan (1)	Bill McAnally Racing (7)	Toyota (7)	155*	58.125 (93.54)	0:59:54	58.222	Report	
2020	August 22	19	Jesse Love (1)	Bill McAnally Racing (8)	Toyota (8)	153*	57.375 (92.34)	0:55:23	62.158	Report	
2021	July 31	54	Joey Iest (1)	Naake-Klauer Motorsports (1)	Ford (7)	150	56.250 (90.53)	0:58:53	57.317	Report	
2022 - 2024	Not held										
2025	May 24	19	Jake Bollman (1)	Bill McAnally Racing (9)	Chevrolet (5)	60*	22.5 (36.24)	0:21:04	63.228	Report	
2026	May 23	50	Trevor Huddleston (1)	High Point Racing (1)	Ford (8)	150	56.250 (90.53)	0:53:53	61.800	Report	

Notes

- 2007: Race extended from 150 laps to 155 laps due to green/white/checker.
- 2011: Race extended from 150 laps to 152 laps due to green/white/checker.
- 2012: Race extended from 150 laps to 153 laps due to green/white/checker.
- 2019: Race extended from 150 laps to 155 laps due to overtime.
- 2020: Race extended from 150 laps to 153 laps due to overtime.
- 2025: Race shortened from 150 laps to 60 laps due to wet weather conditions.

=== Manufacturer wins ===
# Wins	Make	Years Won
8	Toyota	2008–2010, 2014, 2016–2017, 2019–2020
8	Ford	1995, 2011–2013, 2015, 2018, 2021, 2026
5	Chevrolet	1996, 2001, 2004, 2007, 2025
