= Anderson Bowen =

American racing driver

- Born: David Anderson Bowen; October 2, 1997 (age 29); Suwanee, Georgia, U.S.

ARCA Menards Series career
- 7 races run over 2 years
- Best finish: 34th (2014)
- First race: 2013 ARCA Mobile 200 (Mobile)
- Last race: 2014 Federated Car Care ARCA Fall Classic (Salem)
Wins	Top tens	Poles
0	3	0
- Statistics up to date as of July 9, 2023.

David Anderson Bowen (born October 2, 1997) is an American former professional stock car racing driver who has previously competed in the ARCA Racing Series for Cunningham Motorsports. He has also competed in the NASCAR K&N Pro Series East.

== Racing career ==
In 2012, Bowen would run the full schedule of the JEGS/CRA All-Stars Tour, he would win the final race of the year at Watermelon Capital Speedway on his way to finish third in the final points standings whilst also winning rookie of the year honors.

On December 18, 2012, it was announced that Bowen would make select starts for Cunningham Motorsports in both the ARCA Racing Series and the NASCAR K&N Pro Series East with Paul Andrews as his crew chief. In his ARCA debut at Mobile International Speedway, he would start and finish third, and in his East series debut, he would start on the pole at the first Iowa Speedway event, but would finish eleventh. He would remain with the team in 2014, competing in four ARCA events with a best finish of fourth at Mobile, and competing in two races with the team in the East series with a best finish of seventeenth at New Hampshire Motor Speedway. He would also make a one-off start for Venturini Motorsports in the No. 25 Toyota at Dover Motor Speedway, where he would finish 26th due to a crash.

Bowen has not competed in any professional racing series since 2015.

== Personal life ==
Bowen is currently the managing member of Walker Anderson Homes, a company that he owns with his family.

== Motorsports results ==
=== NASCAR ===
(key) (Bold – Pole position awarded by qualifying time. Italics – Pole position earned by points standings or practice time. * – Most laps led.)

==== K&N Pro Series East ====
NASCAR K&N Pro Series East results
Year	Team	No.	Make	1	2	3	4	5	6	7	8	9	10	11	12	13	14	15	16	NKNPSEC	Pts	Ref
2013	Cunningham Motorsports	77	Dodge	BRI	GRE	FIF	RCH	BGS	**IOW**; 11	LGY	COL	IOW; 16	VIR	GRE	NHA	DOV	RAL			38th	61	
2014	Cunningham Motorsports	77	Dodge	NSM	DAY	BRI; 19	GRE	RCH	IOW	BGS	FIF	LGY	NHA; 17	COL	IOW; 28	GLN	VIR	GRE		30th	86	
2014	Venturini Motorsports	25	Toyota																DOV; 26	30th	86	

=== ARCA Racing Series ===
(key) (Bold – Pole position awarded by qualifying time. Italics – Pole position earned by points standings or practice time. * – Most laps led.)

ARCA Racing Series results
Year	Team	No.	Make	1	2	3	4	5	6	7	8	9	10	11	12	13	14	15	16	17	18	19	20	21	ARSC	Pts	Ref
2013	Cunningham Motorsports	22	Dodge	DAY	MOB; 3	SLM; 20	TAL	TOL	ELK	POC	MCH	ROA	WIN	CHI	NJM	POC	BLN	ISF	MAD; 15	DSF	IOW	SLM	KEN	KAN	52nd	510	
2014	Cunningham Motorsports	77	Dodge	DAY	MOB; 4	SLM	TAL	TOL	NJE	POC	MCH	ELK	WIN; 20	CHI	IRP	POC	BLN	ISF	MAD; 6	DSF					34th	700	
2014	Cunningham Motorsports	72	Dodge																		SLM; 16	KEN	KAN		34th	700	

=== CARS Super Late Model Tour ===
(key)

CARS Super Late Model Tour results
Year	Team	No.	Make	1	2	3	4	5	6	7	8	9	10	CSLMTC	Pts	Ref
2015	David Bowen	29	Ford	SNM; 5	ROU	HCY; 7	SNM	TCM	MMS	ROU	CON	MYB	HCY	32nd	54	
