= ARCA races at Roseville =

Annual stock car race in California, U.S.

NAPA Auto Parts 150
ARCA Menards Series West
- Venue: All American Speedway
- Location: Roseville, California; United States
- Corporate sponsor: NAPA Auto Parts
- First race: 1977
- Distance: 49.950 mi (80.387 km)
- Laps: 150
- Previous names: First races Winston Roseville 100 (1977–1979); Winston Roseville 150 (1981–1982); Toyota / NAPA Auto Care 150 (2008); Toyota / NAPA Auto Parts 150 (2009, 2012–2017); Toyota / NAPA Auto Parts Bonus Challenge (2010); Toyota / NAPA Autocare 150 (2011); Toyota / NAPA AutoCare 200 (2018); NAPA Auto Parts / ENEOS 150 (2019); NAPA 125 Presented by CashInTheCan.com (2020); NAPA Auto Care 150 (2021–2023); Second races Toyota / NAPA Auto Parts 150 by Thunder Valley (2008); Toyota / Copart 150 (2009); Toyota / NAPA Auto Parts 150 (2010–2011)
- Most wins (driver): Eric Holmes (4)
- Most wins (team): Bill McAnally Racing (10)
- Most wins (manufacturer): Toyota (10)

Circuit information
- Surface: Asphalt
- Length: 0.333 mi (0.536 km)
- Turns: 4

The NAPA Auto Parts 150 is an ARCA Menards Series West race held annually at All American Speedway in Roseville, California. Ethan Nascimento is the defending race winner.

== History ==
Between the years 1977 and 1982, five NASCAR Winston West Series events were held at the track. Since the renovation prior to the 2008 season, several more ARCA Menards Series West races have been held at the track.

== Past winners ==
Year	Date	No.	Driver	Team	Manufacturer	Race Distance		Race Time	Average Speed (mph)	Report	Ref
Year	Date	No.	Driver	Team	Manufacturer	Laps	Miles (km)	Race Time	Average Speed (mph)	Report	Ref
1977	July 17	82	Sumner McKnight	McKnight Racing	Chevrolet	100	25 (40.234)	0:26:18	57.034	Report	
1978	April 2	01	Jimmy Insolo	Gerald Craker	Pontiac	100	25 (40.234)	0:24:19	61.686	Report	
1979	July 20	10	Tim Williamson	Williamson Racing	Oldsmobile	100	25 (40.234)	0:25:12	59.537	Report	
1980	Not held										
1981	May 24	78	Jim Robinson	Jack Williams	Oldsmobile (2)	150	37.5 (60.350)	0:39:38	56.780	Report	
1982	May 29	16	Jim Bown	Bown Racing	Buick	150	37.5 (60.350)	0:41:19	54.457	Report	
1983 - 2007	Not held										
2008	March 29	20	Eric Holmes	Bill McAnally Racing	Toyota	153*	50.949 (81.994)	1:10:09	43.577	Report	
2008	October 25	22	Jason Bowles	Sunrise Ford Racing	Ford	157*	52.281 (84.138)	1:03:12	49.634	Report	
2009	April 4	20	Eric Holmes (2)	Bill McAnally Racing (2)	Toyota (2)	150	49.950 (80.387)	0:44:21	67.576	Report	
2009	September 26	12	Paulie Harraka	Bill McAnally Racing (3)	Toyota (3)	150	49.950 (80.387)	0:46:55	63.879	Report	
2010	March 27	12	Paulie Harraka (2)	Bill McAnally Racing (4)	Toyota (4)	160*	53.280 (85.746)	0:54:36	58.549	Report	
2010	October 16	20	Eric Holmes (3)	Bill McAnally Racing (5)	Toyota (5)	150	49.950 (80.387)	1:03:25	47.259	Report	
2011	April 16	59	Jason Fensler	Team Cass Racing	Chevrolet (2)	150	49.950 (80.387)	0:51:01	58.746	Report	
2011	October 15	20	Eric Holmes (4)	Bill McAnally Racing (6)	Toyota (6)	152*	50.616 (81.459)	0:56:20	53.911	Report	
2012	October 13	03	Dylan Kwasniewski	Gene Price Motorsports	Ford (2)	150	49.950 (80.387)	1:03:09	47.458	Report	
2013	October 12	24	Cameron Hayley	Gene Price Motorsports (2)	Ford (3)	150	49.950 (80.387)	0:55:59	53.534	Report	
2014	October 11	99	Christian PaHud	Bill McAnally Racing (7)	Toyota (7)	150	49.950 (80.387)	0:56:12	53.327	Report	
2015	October 17	27	Gracin Raz	Jefferson Pitts Racing	Ford (4)	152*	50.616 (81.459)	0:57:03	53.233	Report	
2016	October 15	9	Ryan Partridge	Sunrise Ford Racing (2)	Ford (5)	154*	51.282 (82.530)	1:00:52	50.552	Report	
2017	October 14	9	Michael Self	Sunrise Ford Racing (3)	Ford (6)	150	49.950 (80.387)	0:42:37	70.325	Report	
2018	October 13	99	Cole Rouse	Bill McAnally Racing (8)	Toyota (8)	200	66.600 (107.182)	1:09:13	57.732	Report	
2019	October 12	6	Jagger Jones	Sunrise Ford Racing (4)	Ford (7)	150	49.950 (80.387)	0:45:06	66.452	Report	
2020	October 23	16	Gio Scelzi	Bill McAnally Racing (9)	Toyota (9)	125	41.625 (66.989)	0:41:08	60.717	Report	
2021	October 9	33	P. J. Pedroncelli	Pedroncelli Racing	Toyota (10)	158*	52.614 (84.674)	1:12:55	43.294	Report	
2022	October 1	99	Cole Moore	Bill McAnally Racing (10)	Chevrolet (3)	150	49.950 (80.387)	0:59:34	50.313	Report	
2023	September 30	17	Kaden Honeycutt	McGowan Motorsports	Chevrolet (4)	150	49.950 (80.387)	0:49:15	60.853	Report	
2024	October 5	50	Trevor Huddleston	High Point Racing	Ford (8)	150	49.950 (80.387)	0:37:04	80.852	Report	
2025	September 13	1	Robbie Kennealy	Jan's Towing Racing	Ford (9)	150	49.950 (80.387)	0:43:09	69.455	Report	
2026	September 5	4	Ethan Nascimento	Nascimento Motorsports	Chevrolet (5)	150	49.950 (80.387)	0:52.38	56.941	Report	

Notes

- 2008: First race extended from 150 to 153 laps and second race extended from 150 to 157 laps due to green/white/checker.
- 2010: First race extended from 150 to 160 laps due to green/white/checker.
- 2011: Second race extended from 150 to 152 laps due to green/white/checker.
- 2015: Race extended from 150 to 152 laps due to green/white/checker.
- 2016: Race extended from 150 to 154 laps due to green/white/checker.
- 2021: Race extended from 150 to 158 laps due to overtime.

=== Manufacturer wins ===
# Wins	Make	Years Won
10	(Japan) Toyota	2008, 2009, 2010, 2011, 2014, 2018, 2020, 2021
9	(United States) Ford	2008, 2012, 2013, 2015, 2016, 2017, 2019, 2024, 2025
5	(United States) Chevrolet	1977, 2011, 2022, 2023, 2026
2	(United States) Oldsmobile	1979, 1981
1	(United States) Pontiac	1978
1	(United States) Buick	1982

Previous race: Portland 112	ARCA Menards Series West; NAPA Auto Parts 150	Next race: Madera 150 presented by Madera Ford and the West Coast Stock Car Motorsports Hall of Fame
