= Daryl Harr =

Canadian racing driver (born 1982)

- Born: May 5, 1982 (age 44); St. Albert, Alberta, Canada
- Achievements: 2002 CASCAR West Series champion

NASCAR O'Reilly Auto Parts Series career
- 21 races run over 6 years
- 2014 position: 56th
- Best finish: 40th (2012)
- First race: 2009 Bashas' Supermarkets 200 (Phoenix)
- Last race: 2014 Treatmyclot.com 300 (Auto Club)
Wins	Top tens	Poles
0	0	0
- Statistics up to date as of June 1, 2017.

Daryl Harr (born May 5, 1982) is a Canadian professional stock car racing driver. The St. Albert, Alberta native has competed in the NASCAR Xfinity Series, K&N Pro Series West, CASCAR and the Pirelli World Challenge.

== Racing career ==
=== CASCAR ===
Harr started racing in the CASCAR West Series and CASCAR Super Series in 1998 at age sixteen. He ran the full season a year later while also dabbling in the East Series and the four-race Super Series schedule. Harr again ran the full West season again in 2000, finishing third in points. He also drove the Super Series, finishing seventh in points. After the CASCAR reorganization in 2000, Harr focused mainly on the West Series and ran only a small schedule in the newly expanded Super Series. He recorded his first West win in 2000. In 2001, Harr finished out of the top ten only once and finished third in points. The following year, he won a quarter of the races in the eight-race season and won his first championship. 2003 was Harr's last full-time season, and he won two races en route to a second-place points finish. After focusing mainly on the NASCAR K&N Pro Series West, he came back for a majority of races in 2006 and won the season opening race. After NASCAR purchased CASCAR in 2006 to form the Canadian Tire Series, Harr returned for sporadic races.

=== K&N Pro Series West ===
Harr's lone venture into the K&N Pro Series West in 2001 ended in a crash at the Las Vegas Motor Speedway Bullring. Harr expanded his schedule in 2002, his CASCAR championship-winning season. He continued to run part-time while focusing on CASCAR in 2003. In his first full season, Harr finished seventh in the 2004 point standings. He claimed his first top five in the series in 2005. He scaled back to a partial schedule in 2006 while running mainly in Canada. Returning to the series for the majority of races in 2007, recurring mechanical issues hampered Harr's efforts. Running the full schedule for his family team in 2008, Harr led his first laps in the series. After a disappointing 2009 season and a part-time effort in 2010, he returned for the full 2011 season, finishing eighth in points. He missed two races in 2012 while running seven Nationwide Series starts. Saving the best for last, Harr had arguably his best season in 2013, scoring five top tens. After a couple of races in 2014, Harr left the series.

=== Nationwide Series ===
Scaling back his K&N Pro Series West schedule in 2009, Harr attempted five races with Rick Ware Racing. He made his debut at Phoenix International Raceway, the only race he made all season, finishing 37th. Harr attempted three races the following year with his family team but failed to qualify for all three. An early-season partnership with Jimmy Means Racing ensued in 2011, in which Harr finished one of his three starts. JD Motorsports signed Harr to run a partial schedule in 2012, and he ran seven races in the team's flagship No. 4, including the series' lone Canadian race, at Circuit Gilles Villeneuve, where he recorded a best finish of 23rd. Running four more races in 2013 with JD, harr ran both events at Phoenix, his most successful oval track. In late 2013, it was announced that Harr would pilot a second car part-time for JD in 2014. Harr wound up piloting the new No. 87 car for three races. For one of those races, the Boyd Gaming 300 at Las Vegas Motor Speedway, Harr teamed up with former National Football League placekicker Nick Lowery to help with Lowery's "Champions for Bullying" initiative, thought to be one of the largest programs of its kind. By doing so, Harr became the first NASCAR driver to join a bullying initiative.

=== Road racing ===
After leaving stock car racing in 2014, Harr started participating in road racing, a longstanding passion for him. He also wanted to inspire younger Canadians to get into racing. He started racing in the Pirelli World Challenge in 2016.

== Personal life ==
Harr's father Carl also raced in CASCAR, the NASCAR Pinty's Series and NASCAR K&N Pro Series East.

== Motorsports career results ==
=== NASCAR ===
(key) (Bold – Pole position awarded by qualifying time. Italics – Pole position earned by points standings or practice time. * – Most laps led.)

==== Nationwide Series ====
NASCAR Nationwide Series results
Year	Team	No.	Make	1	2	3	4	5	6	7	8	9	10	11	12	13	14	15	16	17	18	19	20	21	22	23	24	25	26	27	28	29	30	31	32	33	34	35	NNSC	Pts	Ref
2009	Rick Ware Racing	31	Chevy	DAY	CAL	LVS	BRI	TEX	NSH	PHO; 37	TAL	RCH	DAR	CLT	DOV	NSH; DNQ	KEN	MLW	NHA	DAY	CHI	GTY	IRP	IOW	GLN; DNQ	MCH	BRI	CGV; DNQ	ATL	RCH	DOV	KAN	CAL	CLT	MEM	TEX	PHO; DNQ	HOM	142nd	52	
2010	Harr Racing	02	Chevy	DAY	CAL	LVS	BRI	NSH	PHO	TEX	TAL	RCH	DAR	DOV	CLT	NSH	KEN	ROA	NHA	DAY	CHI	GTY	IRP	IOW; DNQ	GLN	MCH	BRI	CGV	ATL	RCH	DOV	KAN; DNQ	CAL	CLT	GTY	TEX	PHO; DNQ	HOM	NA	-	
2011	Means Motorsports	52	Chevy	DAY	PHO; 39	LVS; 35	BRI	CAL	TEX	TAL	NSH	RCH	DAR	DOV	IOW; 24	CLT	CHI	MCH	ROA	DAY	KEN	NHA	NSH	IRP	IOW	GLN	CGV	BRI	ATL	RCH	CHI	DOV	KAN	CLT	TEX				68th	34	
2011	Harr Racing	02	Chevy																																	PHO; DNQ	HOM		68th	34	
2012	JD Motorsports	4	Chevy	DAY	PHO; 33	LVS; 26	BRI	CAL; 28	TEX	RCH	TAL	DAR	IOW; 28	CLT	DOV	MCH	ROA	KEN	DAY	NHA	CHI	IND	IOW; 33	GLN; 30	CGV; 23	BRI	ATL	RCH	CHI	KEN	DOV	CLT	KAN	TEX	PHO; 28	HOM			40th	123	
2013	JD Motorsports	4	Chevy	DAY	PHO; 34	LVS; 31	BRI	CAL; 28	TEX	RCH	TAL	DAR	CLT	DOV	IOW; 24	MCH	ROA	KEN	DAY	NHA	CHI	IND	IOW; 25	GLN	MOH	BRI	ATL	RCH	CHI	KEN	DOV	KAN	CLT	TEX	PHO; 33	HOM			47th	89	
2014	JD Motorsports	87	Chevy	DAY	PHO; 36	LVS; 30	BRI	CAL; 27	TEX	DAR	RCH	TAL	IOW	CLT	DOV	MCH	ROA	KEN	DAY	NHA	CHI	IND	IOW	GLN	MOH	BRI	ATL	RCH	CHI	KEN	DOV	KAN	CLT	TEX	PHO	HOM			56th	37	

==== Canadian Tire Series ====
NASCAR Canadian Tire Series results
Year	Team	No.	Make	1	2	3	4	5	6	7	8	9	10	11	12	13	NCTSC	Pts	Ref
2007	Harr Racing	71	Chevy	HAM	MSP	BAR	MPS	EDM; 25	CGV	MSP	CTR	HAM	BAR	RIS	KWA		50th	88	
2009	Harr Racing	71	Chevy	ASE	DEL	MSP	ASE	MPS	EDM; 14	SAS	MSP	CTR					32nd	259	
2009	Harr Racing	31	Chevy										CGV; 9	BAR	RIS	KWA	32nd	259	
2010	Harr Racing	1	Chevy	DEL	MSP	ASE	TOR	EDM; 22	MPS	SAS	CTR	MSP	CGV	BAR	RIS	KWA	53rd	97	

=== ARCA Racing Series ===
(key) (Bold – Pole position awarded by qualifying time. Italics – Pole position earned by points standings or practice time. * – Most laps led.)

ARCA Racing Series results
Year	Team	No.	Make	1	2	3	4	5	6	7	8	9	10	11	12	13	14	15	16	17	18	19	20	ARSC	Pts	Ref
2010	Harr Racing	02	Chevy	DAY	PBE	SLM	TEX	TAL	TOL	POC	MCH	IOW	MFD	POC	BLN	NJE	ISF	CHI	DSF	TOL	SLM	KAN; 19	CAR	108th	135	
