= ARCA races at Phoenix =

ARCA Menards Series events at Phoenix Raceway

ARCA Menards Series at Phoenix

ARCA Menards Series ARCA Menards Series West
- Venue: Phoenix Raceway
- Location: Avondale, Arizona, United States

Circuit information
- Surface: Asphalt
- Length: 1.000 mi (1.609 km)
- Turns: 4

Stock car racing events in the ARCA Menards Series and ARCA Menards Series West have been held at Phoenix Raceway, in Avondale, Arizona during numerous seasons and times of year since 1977.

== Spring race ==
General Tire 150
- Corporate sponsor: General Tire
- First race: 2020 (main ARCA Series); 2021 (as a combination race with the West Series)
- Distance: 150 mi (240 km)
- Laps: 150
- Most wins (team): Joe Gibbs Racing (3)
- Most wins (manufacturer): Toyota (4)

The General Tire 150 is a 150-mile (240 km) annual ARCA Menards Series and ARCA Menards Series West race held at Phoenix Raceway in Avondale, Arizona. Carson Brown is the defending winner of the event, having won it in 2026.

=== History ===
ARCA's inaugural trip to Phoenix was announced along with the rest of the 2020 series schedule on October 10, 2019. The race is a virtual carryover from the then-NASCAR K&N Pro Series West, which had run at the track at least once annually since 1998. On February 20, 2020, series tire manufacturer General Tire was announced as the race's title sponsor. In 2021, the ARCA Menards Series West joined the ARCA Menards Series in this race, making it a combination race for both series.

=== Past winners ===
Year	Date	No.	Driver	Team	Manufacturer	Race Distance		Race Time	Average Speed (mph)	Report	Ref
Year	Date	No.	Driver	Team	Manufacturer	Laps	Miles (km)	Race Time	Average Speed (mph)	Report	Ref
2020	March 6	20	Chandler Smith	Venturini Motorsports	Toyota	150	150 (240)	1:54:25	78.660	Report	
2021	March 12	18	Ty Gibbs	Joe Gibbs Racing	Toyota (2)	150	150 (240)	1:57:58	76.293	Report	
2022	March 11	17	Taylor Gray	David Gilliland Racing	Ford	154*	154 (248)	1:46:56	86.409	Report	
2023	March 10	41	Tyler Reif	Lowden Jackson Motorsports	Ford (2)	160*	160 (257.495)	2:14:51	71.19	Report	
2024	March 8	18	William Sawalich	Joe Gibbs Racing (2)	Toyota (3)	115*	115 (185.074)	1:20.60	86.142	Report	
2025	March 7	18	Brent Crews	Joe Gibbs Racing (3)	Toyota (4)	165*	165 (265.542)	1:52:0	88.288	Report	
2026	March 5	28	Carson Brown	Pinnacle Racing Group	Chevrolet	150	150 (240)	1:56:5	80.536	Report	

- 2022, 2023 & 2025: Race extended due to a green–white–checker finish
- 2024: Race shortened to 115 laps due to rain

== Fall race ==
Desert Diamond Casino West Valley 100
- Corporate sponsor: Desert Diamond Casino West Valley
- First race: 1977
- Distance: 100 mi (160 km)
- Laps: 100
- Previous names: Winston West Inaugural Phoenix 250 (1977); Arizona NAPA 250 (1978); NAPA Arizona 250 (1979); Arizona Winston 250 (1980); Warner W. Hodgdon 250 (1981); Coors 250 (1982); Sands Chevrolet 250 (1983); 7-Eleven NASCAR 250 (1984); Checker 500 (1988, 1990); Autoworks 500 (1989); Pyroil 500 (1991); Pyroil 500K (1992); Slick 50 500 (1993–1994); Dura Lube 500 (1995–1996); Phoenix 150 (1998); NAPA Auto Parts 100 (1999–2000); NASCAR Winter Heat (2001); Winter Heat Presented by Bosch (2002); Bosch Spark Plug 150 (2003); Subway 150 (2003–2004); United Rentals 150 (2004); United Rentals 100 (2005); Casino Arizona 150 (2005–2006); United Rentals 125 (2006); Alphatrade.com 150 (2007); Jimmie Johnson Foundation 150 (2008–2009); Jimmie Johnson Foundation 100 (2010); 3 Amigos Tequila 125 (2010); 3 Amigos Organic Blanco 100 (2011); Casino Arizona 125 (2011); Casino Arizona 50 (2012–2013); Talking Stick Resort 50 (2012); Talking Stick Resort 60 (2013); Talking Stick Resort 75 (2014); Casino Arizona 100 (2014–2015); Arizona Lottery 100 (2019–2021); Desert Diamond Casino West Valley 100 (2022–present)
- Most wins (driver): Ken Schrader (4)
- Most wins (team): Bill McAnally Racing; Joe Gibbs Racing (5)
- Most wins (manufacturer): Chevrolet (17)

The Desert Diamond Casino West Valley 100 is an annual 100 mi (160 km) ARCA Menards Series West race held at Phoenix Raceway in Avondale, Arizona. Max Reaves is the defending winner of the event, having won it in 2026.

=== Background ===
The ARCA Menards Series West has been racing at Phoenix Raceway in Avondale, Arizona since 1977, when Cale Yarborough won the first event. Today, the track typically holds two races each year — the General Tire 150 in the spring (run with the national ARCA Series) and the Desert Diamond Casino West Valley 100 in the fall (a West-only race). The track hosted the West Series finale from 2019 to 2025.

=== Past winners ===
Year	Date	No.	Driver	Team	Manufacturer	Race Distance		Race Time	Average Speed (mph)	Report	Ref
Year	Date	No.	Driver	Team	Manufacturer	Laps	Miles (km)	Race Time	Average Speed (mph)	Report	Ref
1977	November 27	6	Cale Yarborough	Jim Stacy	Dodge	156	156 (251.058)	1:48:51	85.989	Report	
1978	November 26	43	Richard Petty	Petty Enterprises	Chevrolet	156	156 (251.058)	1:46:13	88.121	Report	
1979	November 25	7	Neil Bonnett	Jim Schmitt	Pontiac	156	156 (251.058)	1:40:41	92.96	Report	
1980	November 23	43	Richard Petty (2)	Petty Enterprises (2)	Chevrolet (2)	156	156 (251.058)	1:52:25	91.391	Report	
1981	November 29	43	Richard Petty (3)	Petty Enterprises (3)	Chevrolet (3)	156	156 (251.058)	1:34:04	99.504	Report	
1982	November 28	88	Bobby Allison	DiGard Motorsports	Chevrolet (4)	156	156 (251.058)	1:53:48	82.25	Report	
1983	November 27	7	Ron Eaton	Ron Eaton	Buick	156	156 (251.058)	1:31:02	102.819	Report	
1984	November 25	73	Bill Schmitt	Bill Schmitt	Chevrolet (5)	156	156 (251.058)	1:34:05	99.486	Report	
1985 - 1987	Not held										
1988	November 6	7	Alan Kulwicki	AK Racing	Ford	312	312 (502.115)	3:26:57	90.457	Report	
1989	November 5	9	Bill Elliott	Melling Racing	Ford (2)	312	312 (502.115)	2:57:08	105.683	Report	
1990	November 4	3	Dale Earnhardt	Richard Childress Racing	Chevrolet (6)	312	312 (502.115)	3:13:25	96.786	Report	
1991	November 3	28	Davey Allison	Robert Yates Racing	Ford (3)	312	312 (502.115)	3:15:31	95.746	Report	
1992	November 1	28	Davey Allison	Robert Yates Racing (2)	Ford (4)	312	312 (502.115)	3:00:12	103.885	Report	
1993	October 31	6	Mark Martin	Roush Racing	Ford (5)	312	312 (502.115)	3:06:30	100.375	Report	
1994	October 30	5	Terry Labonte	Hendrick Motorsports	Chevrolet (7)	312	312 (502.115)	2:54:12	107.463	Report	
1995	October 29	10	Ricky Rudd	Rudd Performance Motorsports	Ford (6)	312	312 (502.115)	3:03:18	102.128	Report	
1996	October 27	43	Bobby Hamilton	Petty Enterprises (4)	Pontiac (2)	312	312 (502.115)	2:56:16	106.203	Report	
1997	Not held										
1998	April 19	86	Rich Woodland Jr.	Woodland Racing	Chevrolet (8)	150	150 (240)	1:48:14	83.154	Report	
1999	March 27	2	Mike Wallace	Fred Biagi	Ford (7)	100	100 (160.934)	1:14:20	80.717	Report	
2000	March 18	85	Kevin Richards	Monaco Enterprises	Chevrolet (9)	100	100 (160.934)	1:38:11	61.11	Report	
2001	February 4	99	Ken Schrader	Ken Schrader Racing	Pontiac (3)	150	150 (240)	1:36:38	93.136	Report	
2002	February 2	16	Austin Cameron	Bill McAnally Racing	Chevrolet (10)	150	150 (240)	1:28:21	101.868	Report	
2003	February 2	99	Ken Schrader (2)	Ken Schrader Racing (2)	Pontiac (4)	151*	151 (243.011)	1:44:30	86.699	Report	
2003	October 5	08	Scott Lynch	Windward Racing Enterprises	Dodge (2)	150	150 (240)	1:18:46	114.262	Report	
2004	January 25	99	Ken Schrader (3)	Ken Schrader Racing (3)	Pontiac (5)	150	150 (240)	1:31:10	98.72	Report	
2004	October 3	08	Scott Lynch	Windward Racing Enterprises (2)	Dodge (3)	150	150 (240)	1:28:16	101.964	Report	
2005	January 30	88	David Gilliland	Golembeski Racing	Chevrolet (11)	100	100 (160.934)	0:55:17	108.532	Report	
2005	April 21	33	Burney Lamar	Kevin Harvick Incorporated	Chevrolet (12)	158*	158 (254.28)	1:45:40	89.716	Report	
2006	January 22	99	Ken Schrader (4)	Ken Schrader Racing (4)	Pontiac (6)	125	125 (201.17)	1:29:08	84.144	Report	
2006	April 20	44	Andrew Myers	Nancy Myers	Chevrolet (13)	153*	153 (246.23)	2:03:55	74.082	Report	
2007	April 19	10	Joey Logano	Joe Gibbs Racing	Toyota	158*	158 (254.28)	1:54:44	82.626	Report	
2008	April 10	2	Mike David	Randy Lynch	Toyota (2)	150	150 (240)	1:51:33	80.681	Report	
2009	April 16	6	Jason Bowles	Sunrise Ford Racing	Ford (8)	151*	151 (243.011)	1:52:57	80.212	Report	
2010	April 8	20	Eric Holmes	Bill McAnally Racing (2)	Toyota (3)	100	100 (160.934)	2:01:35	51.323	Report	
2010	November 13	26	Greg Pursley	Gene Price Motorsports	Ford (9)	125	125 (201.17)	1:56:01	64.646	Report	
2011	February 24	26	Greg Pursley (2)	Gene Price Motorsports (2)	Ford (10)	100	100 (160.934)	1:35:42	62.696	Report	
2011	November 12	11	Ryan Blaney	Dave Blaney	Toyota (4)	125	125 (201.17)	1:37:07	77.227	Report	
2012	March 3	17	David Mayhew	Steve McGowan Motorsports	Chevrolet (14)	50	50 (80.47)	0:45:24	66.079	Report	
2012	November 10	21	Michael Self	Richard Childress Racing (2)	Chevrolet (15)	50	50 (80.47)	0:28:19	105.945	Report	
2013	March 2	26	Greg Pursley (3)	Gene Price Motorsports (3)	Ford (11)	60	60 (96.56)	0:49:20	72.973	Report	
2013	November 8	02	Gray Gaulding	SS-Green Light Racing	Toyota (5)	50	50 (80.47)	0:35:18	84.946	Report	
2014	February 27	00	Cole Custer	Bill McAnally Racing (3)	Chevrolet (16)	80*	80 (128.75)	1:06:40	72	Report	
2014	November 6	19	Nick Drake	Bill McAnally Racing (4)	Toyota (6)	103*	103 (165.76)	1:25:12	72.535	Report	
2015	November 12	54	Todd Gilliland	Bill McAnally Racing (5)	Toyota (7)	101*	101 (162.54)	1:09:56	86.654	Report	
2016 — 2018	Not held										
2019	November 9	40	Ty Gibbs	Levin Racing with Joe Gibbs Racing	Toyota (8)	108*	108 (173.809)	1:20:16	80.731	Report	
2020	November 7	4	David Gilliland (2)	DGR-Crosley	Ford (12)	100	100 (160.934)	1:10:9	85.531	Report	
2021	November 6	18	Ty Gibbs	Joe Gibbs Racing (2)	Toyota (7)	100	100 (160.934)	1:10:9	85.531	Report	
2022	November 5	18	Sammy Smith	Kyle Busch Motorsports	Toyota (8)	107*	107 (172.2)	1:25:28	75.117	Report	
2023	November 3	18	William Sawalich	Joe Gibbs Racing (3)	Toyota (9)	100	100 (160.934)	1:07:17	89.175	Report	
2024	November 8	28	Connor Zilisch	Pinnacle Racing Group	Chevrolet (17)	100	100 (160.934)	1:01:02	98.307	Report	
2025	November 1	18	Brent Crews	Joe Gibbs Racing (4)	Toyota (10)	100	100 (160.934)	0:59:05	101.551	Report	
2026	October 17	18	Max Reaves	Joe Gibbs Racing (5)	Toyota (11)	114*	114 (183.47)	1:21:24	83.959	Report	

Spring race
Preceded by General Tire 200	ARCA Menards Series; General Tire 150	Succeeded by Tide 150
Preceded by Oil Workers 150	ARCA Menards Series West; General Tire 150	Succeeded by Tucson ARCA Menards West 150

Fall race
Preceded by Star Nursery 150	ARCA Menards Series West; Desert Diamond Casino West Valley 100	Succeeded by NAPA Auto Parts 150
