= Lebanon I-44 Speedway =

Speedway in Missouri

Coordinates: 37°44′03″N 92°35′57″W

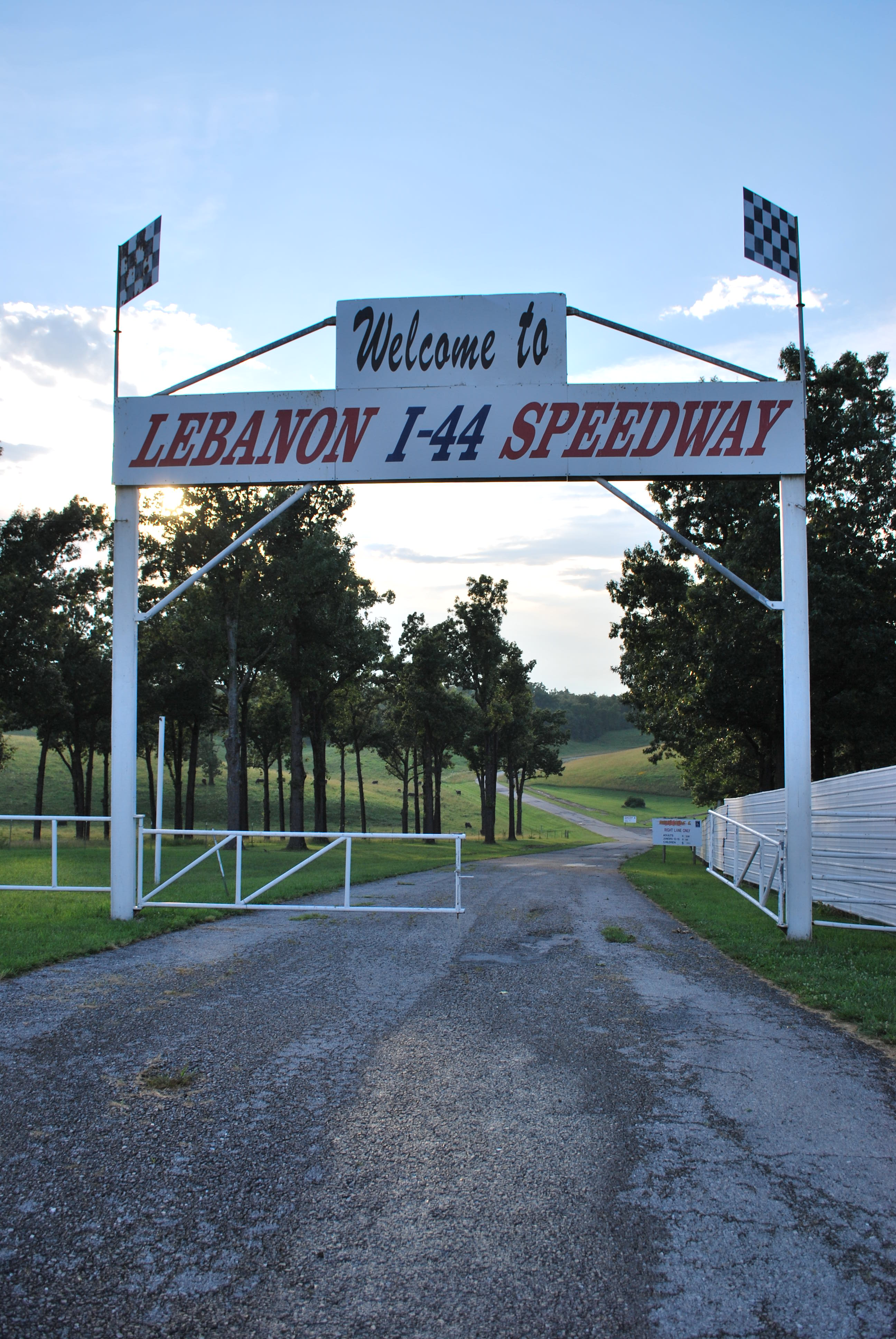
Entrance

Lebanon I-44 Speedway is a multi-purpose speedway located in the Ozark Highlands, just off Interstate 44 outside Lebanon, Missouri, United States.

The main 3/8 mile oval has been holding races since 1982. The 1/5 mile "Inner Track" or "Little Track" is in the small infield that has held races for 4 cylinders and an occasional Midwest Mods race since June 2018.

Lebanon I-44 is known for launching the careers of drivers such as Carl Edwards, Jamie McMurray, Justin Jennings, Kenny Wallace, Mike Wallace, Kyle Donahue and Kevin Donahue and many other great racers. Chrissy Wallace was the 2011 track champion in the Pro Late Model division. The Speedway is the main breeding ground for most Missouri and MB Motorsports Asphalt racers.

It was built by Bill Willard and currently runs as an asphalt and dirt track. It is also an approved NASCAR speedway.

The track has held touring races. The USAC National Sprint Car Championship visited the racetrack from 1990 to 1992 and later in 2004, whereas the USAC National Midget Series had a race in 1992. The World of Outlaws Late Model Series had races in 1988 and from 2005 to 2008. The ARTGO Challenge Series raced at the track from 1991 to 1997, as did its successor NASCAR Midwest Series from 1998 to 2001. One K&N West Series race was held at the track in 2013 and it was won by Michael Self.

== ARCA/CRA ==
The CRA JEGS All-Stars Tour held the Master Of The Pros 144 at Lebanon from 2013 to 2017.

- 2013 - Chase Elliott
- 2014 - Anderson Bowen
- 2015 - John Hunter Nemechek
- 2016 - John Hunter Nemechek
- 2017 - Cole Williams

In 2020, the ARCA Menards Series's Zinsser SmartCoat 200 was held at the racetrack, whereas the ARCA/CRA Super Series and CRA JEGS All-Stars Tour had two races.
