= 2011 NASCAR K&N Pro Series West =

58th season of the NASCAR K&N Pro Series West

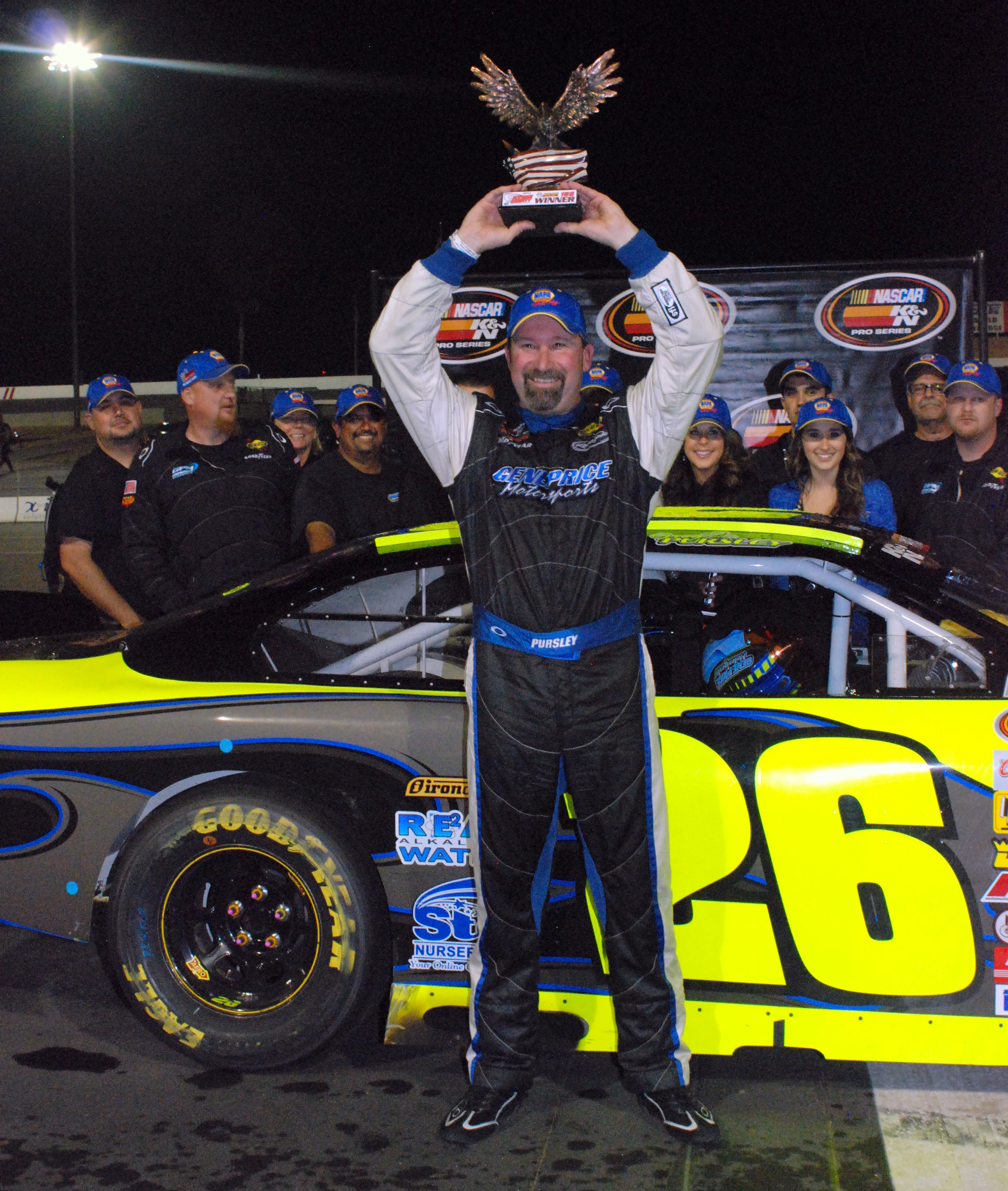
Greg Pursley, the 2011 NASCAR K&N Pro Series West champion

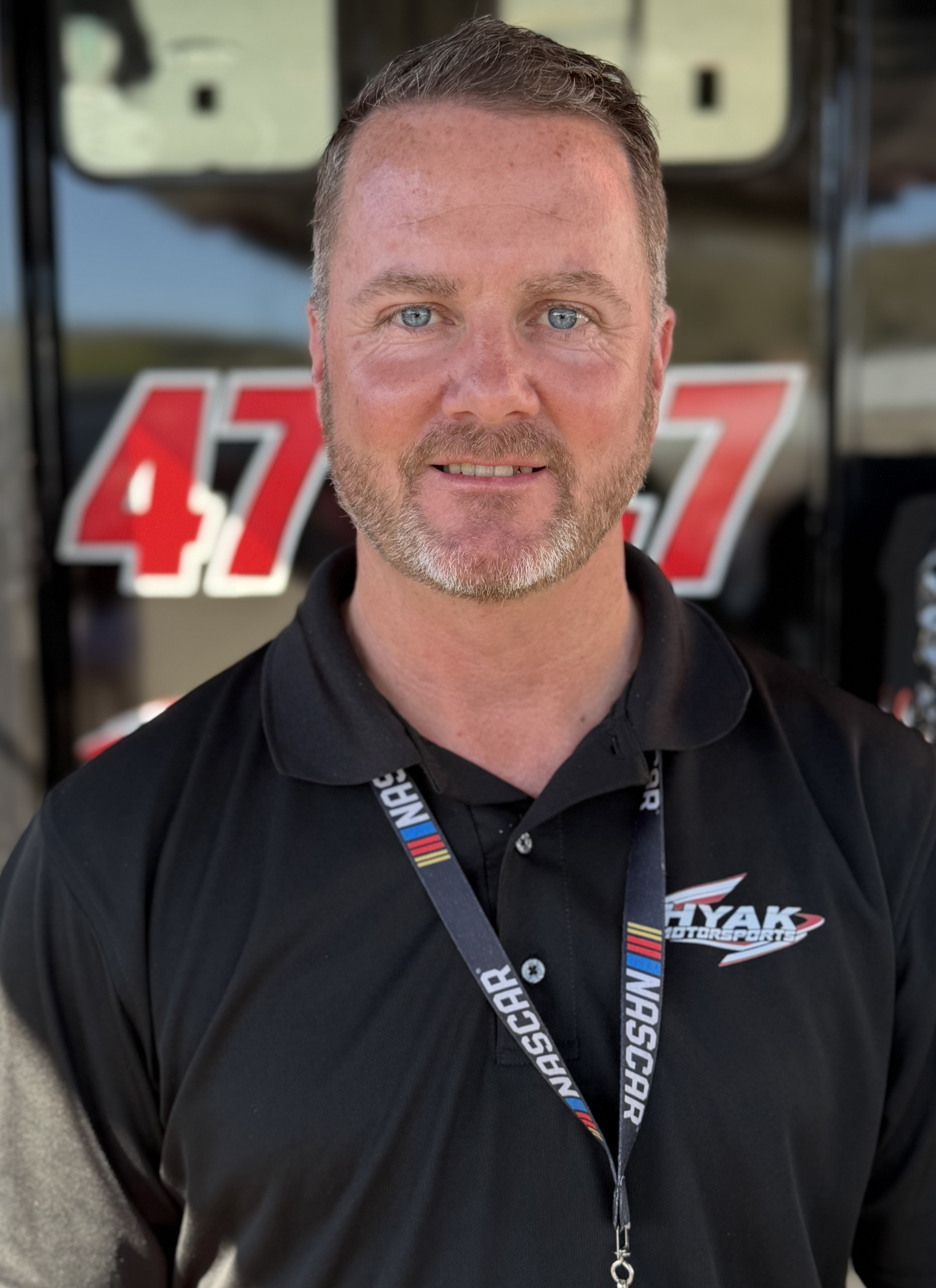
Eric Holmes finished second behind Pursley in the championship by 262 points

The 2011 NASCAR K&N Pro Series West was the 58th season of the NASCAR K&N Pro Series West, a regional stock car racing series sanctioned by NASCAR. It began with the 3 Amigos Organic Blanco 100 at Phoenix International Raceway on February 24, 2011, and concluded with the Casino Arizona 125 at the same track on November 12, 2011. Greg Pursley won the championship, 262 points ahead of Eric Holmes.

== Schedule and results ==
The 2011 season included 14 individual races, although Phoenix International Raceway and All American Speedway hosted two races each. The race at Iowa Speedway was in combination with the NASCAR K&N Pro Series East.

| Date | Name | Racetrack | Location | Winner |
|---|---|---|---|---|
| February 24 | 3 Amigos Organic Blanco 100 | Phoenix International Raceway | Avondale, Arizona | Greg Pursley |
| April 16 | Toyota / NAPA Autocare 150 | All American Speedway | Roseville, California | Jason Fensler |
| April 30 | Larry H. Miller Dealerships Utah Grand Prix | Miller Motorsports Park | Tooele, Utah | Greg Pursley |
| May 21 | Pork 'Be Inspired' 175 Pres. by Tompkins Ind. | Iowa Speedway | Newton, Iowa | Brett Moffitt |
| June 11 | O'Reilly Auto Parts 200 | The Bullring at Las Vegas Motor Speedway | Las Vegas, Nevada | Greg Pursley |
| June 25 | Thunder Valley Casino Resort 200 | Infineon Raceway | Sonoma, California | Joey Logano |
| July 2 | Southern California Toyota Dealers 200 | Irwindale Speedway | Irwindale, California | Greg Pursley |
| July 10 | Evergreen 200 | Evergreen Speedway | Monroe, Washington | Greg Pursley |
| July 24 | Bi-Mart Salute to the Troops 125 | Portland International Raceway | Portland, Oregon | Luis Martinez Jr. |
| August 6 | Toyota / NAPA Auto Parts 150 | Colorado National Speedway | Erie, Colorado | Dylan Kwasniewski |
| August 13 | Toyota / TTC 150 | Montana Raceway Park | Kalispell, Montana | Dylan Kwasniewski |
| September 3 | Spokane 200 | Spokane County Raceway | Spokane, Washington | Eric Holmes |
| October 15 | Toyota / NAPA Auto Parts 150 | All American Speedway | Roseville, California | Eric Holmes |
| November 12 | Casino Arizona 125 | Phoenix International Raceway | Avondale, Arizona | Ryan Blaney |

== Full Drivers' Championship ==
(key) Bold – Pole position awarded by time. Italics – Pole position set by owner's points. * – Most laps led.

| Pos | Driver | PHO | AAS | MMP | IOW | LVS | SON | IRW | EVG | PIR | CNS | MRP | SPO | AAS | PHO | Pts |
|---|---|---|---|---|---|---|---|---|---|---|---|---|---|---|---|---|
| 1 | Greg Pursley | 1* | **3*** | 1 | 1 (Note: Finished 4th overall) | **1*** | 4 | **1*** | **1** | 26* | 2 | **4** | 3 | 2 | **23*** | 2324 |
| 2 | Eric Holmes | 14 | 6 | 13* | 6 (Note: Finished 14th overall) | 22 | 3 | 4 | 4 | 2 | 5 | 3 | 1 | 1 | 4 | 2062 |
| 3 | Moses Smith | 8 | 2 | 2 | 13 (Note: Finished 36th overall) | 20 | 7 | 12 | 3 | 4 | 6 | 10 | 5 | 17 | 17 | 1980 |
| 4 | Luis Martinez Jr. | 12 | 7 | 6 | 7 (Note: Finished 15th overall) | 7 | 27 | 13 | 9 | **1** | 4 | 11 | 4 | 4 | 25 | 1942 |
| 5 | Dylan Kwasniewski | | 4 | 25 | 4 (Note: Finished 10th overall) | 2 | 26 | 3 | 2* | 29 | **1*** | 1* | **2*** | 9* | 33 | 1856 |
| 6 | Brett Thompson | 5 | 8 | 22 | 3 (Note: Finished 7th overall) | 12 | 15 | 16 | 19 | 6 | 3 | 6 | 7 | 12 | 34 | 1824 |
| 7 | Michael Self | 15 | 14 | 8 | 8 (Note: Finished 24th overall) | 4 | 25 | 5 | 11 | 8 | 13 | 5 | 6 | 20 | 32 | 1807 |
| 8 | Daryl Harr | 13 | 13 | 19 | 12 (Note: Finished 35th overall) | 6 | 23 | 18 | 5 | 20 | 12 | 17 | 15 | 8 | 31 | 1661 |
| 9 | Ryan Philpott | 23 | 9 | 29 | DNQ | 13 | 19 | 14 | 13 | 10 | 10 | 13 | 19 | 7 | 16 | 1660 |
| 10 | Carl Harr | 24 | DNQ | 9 | DNQ | 14 | 17 | 22 | 16 | 28 | 14 | 9 | 9 | 21 | 20 | 1532 |
| 11 | Greg Rayl | 28 | 17 | 10 | DNQ | 9 | 40 | 21 | 12 | 16 | 18 | 15 | 13 | 13 | 28 | 1496 |
| 12 | Justin Funkhouser | 29 | 12 | 34 | DNQ | 8 | 29 | 25 | 17 | 17 | 19 | 19 | 12 | 15 | | 1363 |
| 13 | Jack Sellers | 26 | 19 | 15 | DNQ | 18 | 30 | 26 | 18 | 19 | 17 | 18 | 20 | 24 | | 1297 |
| 14 | David Mayhew | 9 | 10 | 5 | 2 (Note: Finished 5th overall) | 23 | 24 | 8 | | 12 | | | | | 10 | 1195 |
| 15 | Travis Milburn | 35 | 11 | 27 | DNQ | 17 | 31 | 20 | 14 | 27 | | | 10 | 14 | 39 | 1147 |
| 16 | Derek Thorn | 3 | | | | 28 | | 2 | | 3 | | | | 11 | 5 | 869 |
| 17 | Jonathon Gomez | 2 | 20 | 4 | 14 (Note: Finished 37th overall) | 25 | | | | | | | 8 | | 38 | 838 |
| 18 | Spencer Gallagher | 27 | DNQ | 17 | DNQ | 24 | 28 | | | 7 | | | | | 27 | 792 |
| 19 | John Wood | | | | | | | 24 | 15 | | 15 | 14 | 14 | 23 | 22 | 760 |
| 20 | Jason Fensler | | 1 | | | 3 | | 10 | | | | | | 16 | | 599 |
| 21 | Johnny Borneman III | DNQ | | | | 21 | 8 | 6 | | | | | | | 9 | 582 |
| 22 | Chad Boat | 11 | | | | | | | | | 7 | | | 5 | 7 | 577 |
| 23 | Brennan Newberry | **33** | | | 11 (Note: Finished 32nd overall) | 5 | | 11 | | | | | | | 26 | 569 |
| 24 | Carlos Vieira | 18 | | 11 | | | 21 | 19 | | | | | | | 18 | 554 |
| 25 | Brady Flaherty | | 24 | 12 | | 19 | 36 | | | 24 | | | | | 29 | 546 |
| 26 | Stan Silva Jr. | 30 | 16 | 21 | | 10 | 22 | | | | | | | | | 519 |
| 27 | Robbie Brand | 19 | DNQ | | | 26 | | 15 | | | | | | | 19 | 503 |
| 28 | Justin Philpott | | 18 | | | 27 | | | 6 | | | 20 | | | 35 | 502 |
| 29 | Brandon Davis | | | 24 | | | **39** | 28 | | 11 | | | | | 8 | 493 |
| 30 | Cameron Hayley | | | | | | | | | | | 2 | 18 | 3 | 40 | 492 |
| 31 | Thomas Martin | 20 | 21 | 28 | DNQ | | | | | | | | 22 | | | 488 |
| 32 | Todd Souza | 16 | | | | | 10 | | | 23 | | | | | 13 | 472 |
| 33 | Jim Inglebright | 6 | | 3 | | | 6 | | | | | | | | | 470 |
| 34 | Ben Kennedy | | | | | | | | | | 8 | 8 | | | 15 | 402 |
| 35 | Brian Wong | | | 7 | | | 5 | | | | | | | | 21 | 401 |
| 36 | Taylor Cuzick | 36 | | | 10 (Note: Finished 31st overall) | 11 | | 27 | | | | | | | | 401 |
| 37 | Jessica Brunelli | | | | | 16 | 33 | | | | | | | 22 | 14 | 397 |
| 38 | Andrew Ranger | 7 | | **20** | | | | | | 18 | | | | | | 368 |
| 39 | Cassie Gannis | | | | | | | 23 | | | 16 | | 16 | | DNQ | 358 |
| 40 | Kyle Kelley | | | 23 | | | 11 | | | 13 | | | | | | 348 |
| 41 | Hershel McGriff | | | 16 | | | 20 | | | 14 | | | | | | 339 |
| 42 | Alex Bowman | | | | | | | | | | 9 | | | | 2 | 318 |
| 43 | Troy Ermish | 21 | 22 | | | | 14 | | | | | | | | | 318 |
| 44 | Billy Kann | 22 | | | DNQ | | | 29 | | | | | | | DNQ | 316 |
| 45 | Dylan Lupton | | | | | | | | | | | 12 | | 18 | 37 | 288 |
| 46 | Isaac Sherman | | 23 | 26 | DNQ | | | | | | | | | | | 282 |
| 47 | Scott Ivie | | | 31 | | | 18 | | | 21 | | | | | | 279 |
| 48 | D. J. Kennington | 10 | | | | | | | | | | | | | 11 | 264 |
| 49 | Rod Johnson Jr. | | | 14 | 9 (Note: Finished 30th overall) | | | | | | | | | | | 259 |
| 50 | Andrew Myers | 17 | | | | | | 9 | | | | | | | | 250 |
| 51 | Jeff Oleen | | | | | 15 | | 17 | | | | | | | | 230 |
| 52 | Jason Bowles | | | | 5 (Note: Finished 13th overall) | | | | | | | | | | 30 | 228 |
| 53 | Dave Garber | | | | | | | | | | | 16 | 17 | | | 227 |
| 54 | Daniel Suárez | 31 | | | | | | | | | | | | | 6 | 225 |
| 55 | Dave Smith | | | | | | 32 | | | 5 | | | | | | 222 |
| 56 | Wes Banks | 34 | 15 | | | | | | | | | | | | DNQ | 219 |
| 57 | Chris Evans | | | | | | | | | 15 | | | 21 | | | 218 |
| 58 | Paul Pedroncelli Jr. | | | | | | 13 | | | | | | | DNQ | | 212 |
| 59 | Braeden Havens | | | | | | | | | | | | 11 | DNQ | | 209 |
| 60 | Joey Logano | | | | | | 1* | | | | | | | | | 190 |
| 61 | Tom Klauer | | | | | | 37 | | | 9 | | | | | | 190 |
| 62 | Jason Fraser | | | | | | | | 10 | | | | | | 36 | 189 |
| 63 | Ryan Blaney | | | | | | | | | | | | | | 1 | 185 |
| 64 | Kevin Culver | | | | | | | | 20 | 30 | | | | | | 176 |
| 65 | David Gilliland | | | | | | 2 | | | | | | | | | 175 |
| 66 | Joe Miller | | | 30 | DNQ | | | | | | | | | | | 170 |
| 67 | Chase Elliott | | | | | | | | | | | | | | 3 | 165 |
| 68 | Ty Dillon | 4 | | | | | | | | | | | | | | 165 |
| 69 | Eric Schmidt | | 5 | | | | | | | | | | | | | 155 |
| 70 | Jacob Gomes | | | | | | | | | | | | | **6** | | 155 |
| 71 | Chris Holloway | | | | | | | 7 | | | | | | | | 146 |
| 72 | Naima Long | | | | | | | | 7 | | | | | | | 146 |
| 73 | Michael Waltrip | | | | | | | | | | | 7 | | | | 146 |
| 74 | Jeff Barkshire | | | | | | | | 8 | | | | | | | 142 |
| 75 | Dale Quarterley | | | | DNQ | | 9 | | | | | | | | | 138 |
| 76 | Matt Scott | | | | | | | | | | | | | 10 | | 134 |
| 77 | Paulie Harraka | | | | | | 12 | | | | | | | | | 132 |
| 78 | Chris Eggleston | | | | | | | | | | 11 | | | | | 130 |
| 79 | Garland Self | | | | | | 41 | | | 25 | | | | | | 128 |
| 80 | Carlos Iaconelli | | | | | | | | | | | | | | 12 | 127 |
| 81 | Craig Raudman | | | | | | 16 | | | | | | | | | 115 |
| 82 | Gareth Nixon | | | 18 | | | | | | | | | | | | 109 |
| 83 | Dylan Hutchison | | | | | | | | | | | | | 19 | | 106 |
| 84 | Ronnie Hults | | | | | | | | | | 20 | | | | | 103 |
| 85 | Tomy Drissi | | | | | | | | | 22 | | | | | | 97 |
| 86 | Dylan Presnell | | | | | | | | | | | | | | 24 | 91 |
| 87 | Travis Pastrana | 25 | | | | | | | | | | | | | | 88 |
| 88 | Andrew Murray | | | | | | | | | | | | | DNQ | | 85 |
| 89 | Jason Patison | | DNQ | | | | | | | | | | | | | 82 |
| 90 | Kenny Bartram | | | | | | | | | | | | | DNQ | | 82 |
| 91 | Pat O'Keefe | | | | | | | | | | | | | DNQ | | 76 |
| 92 | Tony Toste | | | 32 | | | | | | | | | | | | 67 |
| 93 | Alex Kennedy | 32 | | | | | | | | | | | | | | 67 |
| 94 | Steve Jones | | | 33 | | | | | | | | | | | | 64 |
| 95 | Boris Said | | | | | | 34 | | | | | | | | | 61 |
| 96 | Steve Petty | | | | | | 35 | | | | | | | | | 58 |
| 97 | Rob Morris | | | | | | 38 | | | | | | | | | 49 |
| | Ryan Lynch | | | | DNQ | | | | | | | | | | | |
| | Cale Conley | | | | DNQ | | | | | | | | | | | |
| | Michelle Theriault | | | | DNQ | | | | | | | | | | | |
| | John Salemi | | | | DNQ | | | | | | | | | | | |
| | Tanner Whitten | | | | DNQ | | | | | | | | | | | |
| | Joey Gase | | | | DNQ | | | | | | | | | | | |

== See also ==
- 2011 NASCAR Sprint Cup Series
- 2011 NASCAR Nationwide Series
- 2011 NASCAR Camping World Truck Series
- 2011 ARCA Racing Series
- 2011 NASCAR Whelen Modified Tour
- 2011 NASCAR Whelen Southern Modified Tour
- 2011 NASCAR Canadian Tire Series
- 2011 NASCAR Corona Series
- 2011 NASCAR Stock V6 Series
