= 2016 NASCAR K&N Pro Series West =

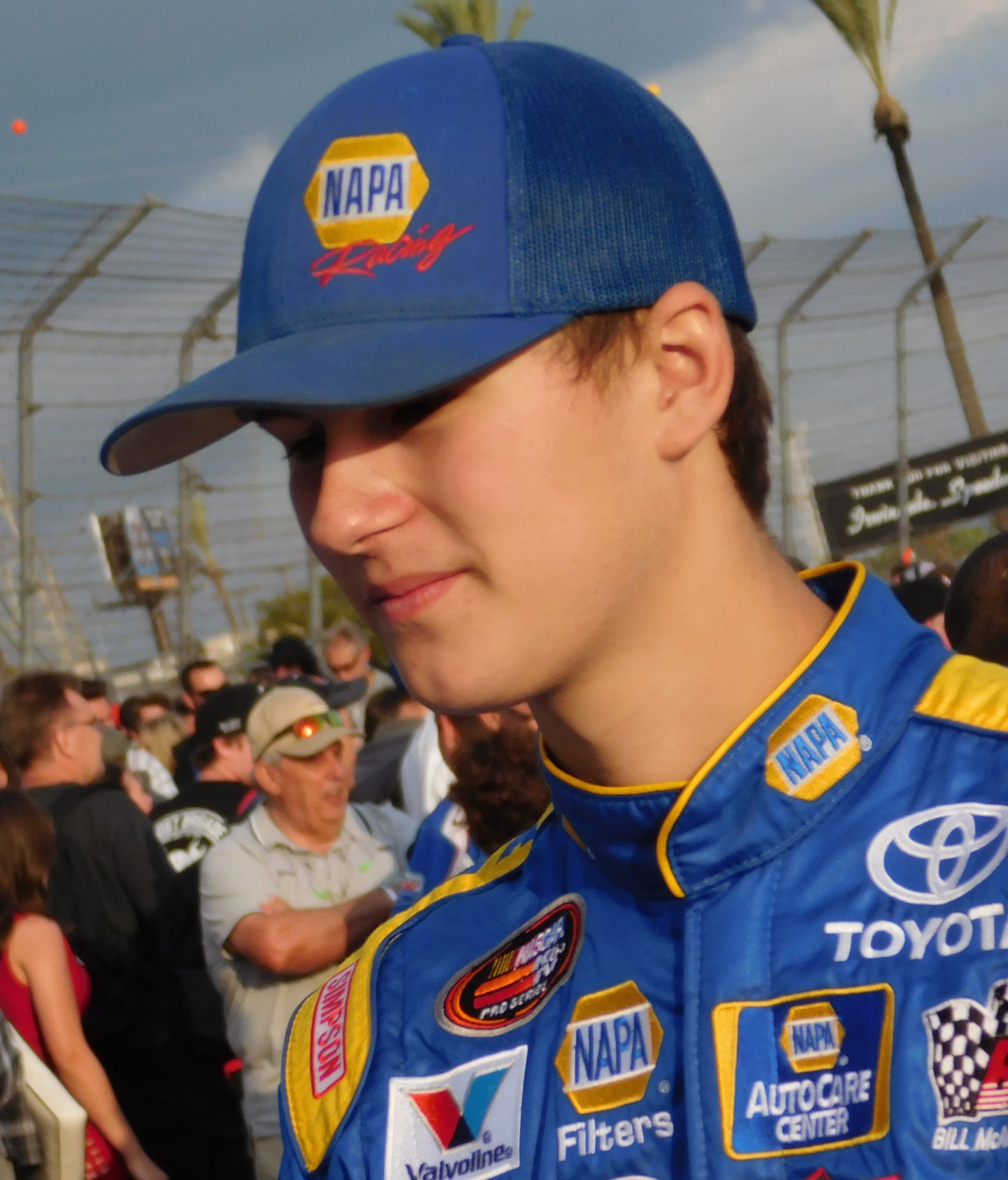
Todd Gilliland, the 2016 K&N Pro Series West champion. This was the first of his two consecutive titles.

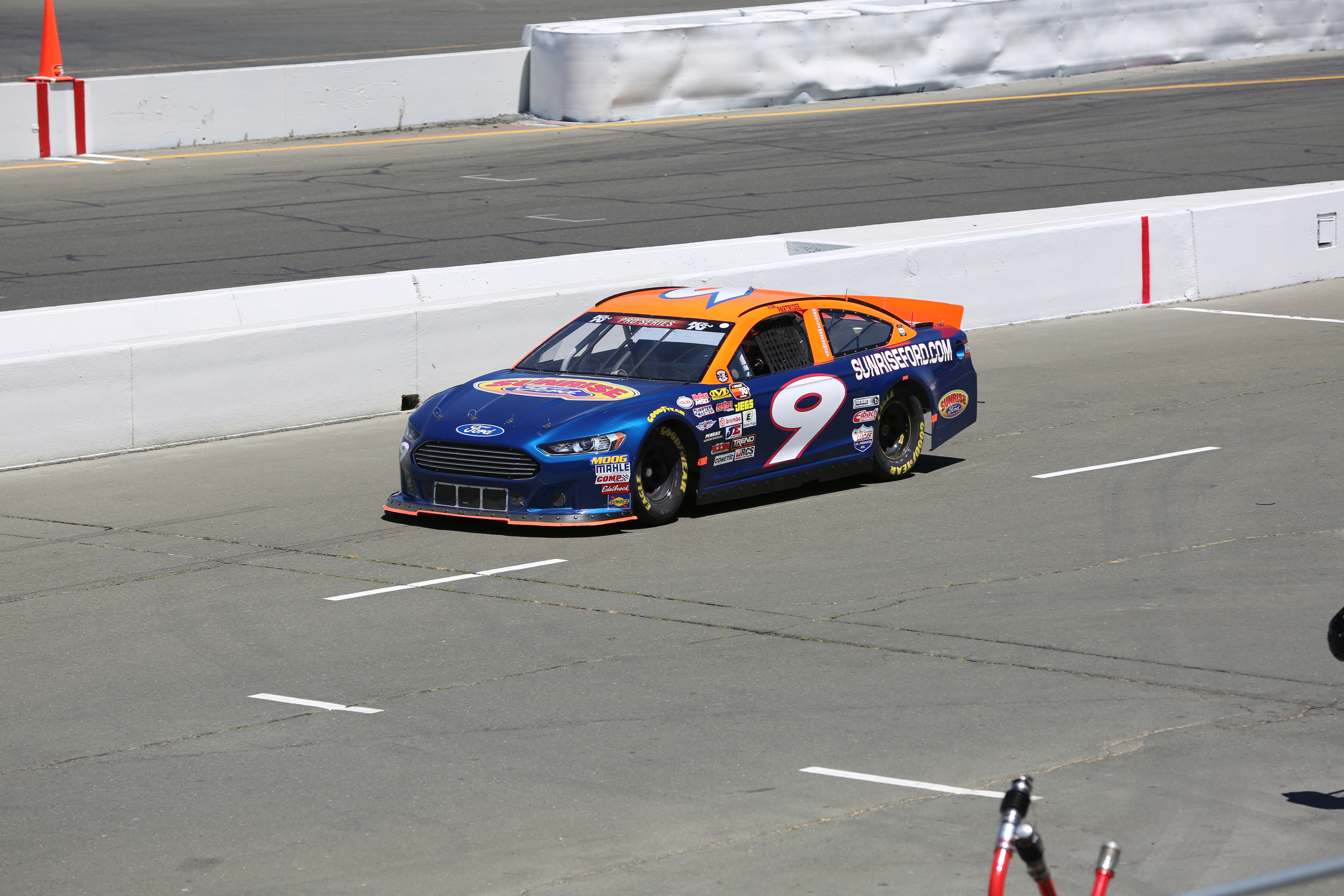
Ryan Partridge, driving the No. 9 car for Sunrise Ford Racing, finished second behind Gilliland in the championship by just 13 points.

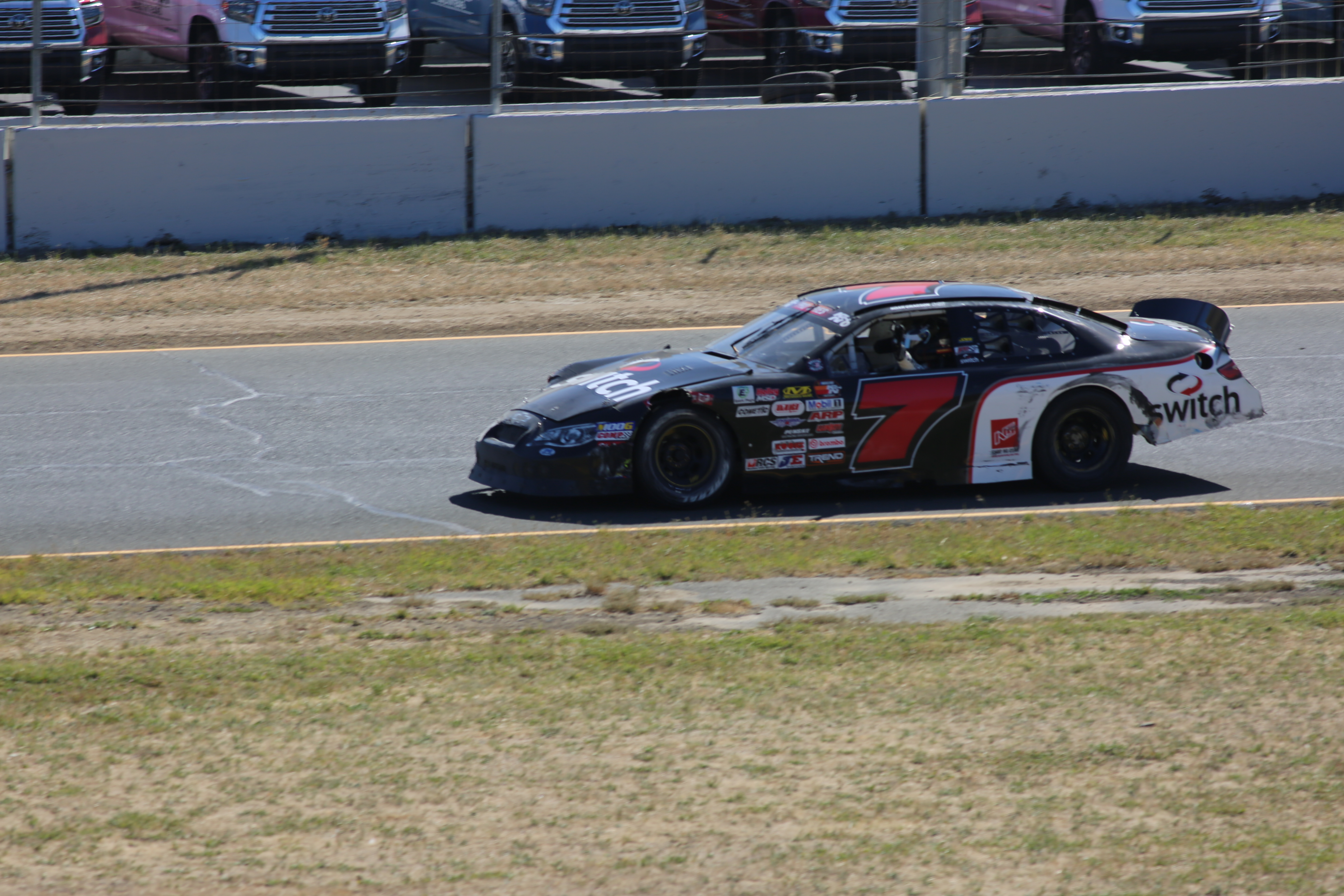
Noah Gragson, driving the No. 7 car for Jefferson Pitts Racing, finished third in the championship.

The 2016 NASCAR K&N Pro Series West was the sixty-third season of the K&N Pro Series West. It began at Irwindale Speedway on March 19 and concluded at All American Speedway on October 15. Chris Eggleston entered the season as the defending drivers' champion. Todd Gilliland won the championship, thirteen points in front of Ryan Partridge.

Gilliland also became the youngest champion in West Series and NASCAR history, winning the title at 16 years and 5 months. The record for youngest champion in all of NASCAR was broken by Sam Mayer's 2019 East Series championship when he was 16 years, 3 months, and 8 days. However, Gilliland remains the youngest West Series champion.

== Drivers ==
No.	Manufacturer	Car Owner	Race Driver	Crew Chief
1	Chevrolet	Valerie Inglebright	Jim Inglebright 1	Rodney Haygood
5	Chevrolet	Charlie Silva	Michael Shawhan (R) 1	John Krebs
06	Chevrolet 12; Ford 2	Dave Hansen	John Wood 7	Mike Holleran 9 Kevin McCarty 1 Stafford Smith 1 John Wood 1 Joe Carr 2
06	Chevrolet 12; Ford 2	Dave Hansen	Will Rodgers (R) 6	Mike Holleran 9 Kevin McCarty 1 Stafford Smith 1 John Wood 1 Joe Carr 2
06	Chevrolet 12; Ford 2	Dave Hansen	Andrew Koens (R) 1	Mike Holleran 9 Kevin McCarty 1 Stafford Smith 1 John Wood 1 Joe Carr 2
6	Ford	Bob Bruncati	Cole Rouse (R)	Bill Sedgwick
07	Chevrolet 1	Scott Bomenger	Colton Nelson (R) 2	Danny Cristiani 2
07	Ford 1	Scott Bomenger	Colton Nelson (R) 2	Danny Cristiani 2
7	Ford	Jerry Pitts	Noah Gragson	Jerry Pitts
08	Toyota	Sue McCarty	John Wood 1	Mike Holleran 1
08	Toyota	Sue McCarty	Dan Phillippi (R) 1	Kevin McCarty 2
08	Toyota	Sue McCarty	Alex Malycke (R) 1	Kevin McCarty 2
09	Ford	Rodrigo San Martin	Christian Celaya 1	Tony Ponkauskas
9	Ford	Bob Bruncati	Ryan Partridge	Jeff Schrader
11	Chevrolet	John Krebs	Takuma Koga 4	John Krebs 2
11	Chevrolet	John Krebs	Takuma Koga 4	Thomas Wicks 2
13	Toyota	Kelly Souza	Todd Souza 6	Michael Muñoz
14	Ford 10	Penny Wood	Matt Levin 8	Chase Newell 8
14	Ford 10	Penny Wood	Jack Chisholm 1	Mike Holleran 1
14	Ford 10	Penny Wood	Stafford Smith (R) 1	Kent Smith 1
14	Chevrolet 4	Penny Wood	Sting Ray Robb (R) 3	Sonny Wahl 4
14	Chevrolet 4	Penny Wood	Dan Phillippi (R) 1	Sonny Wahl 4
15	Chevrolet	Jack Sellers 1	Jack Sellers 4	Brian Carson
15	Chevrolet	Eric Steele 2	Jack Sellers 4	Brian Carson
15	Chevrolet	John Krebs 1	Jack Sellers 4	Brian Carson
16	Toyota	Bill McAnally	Todd Gilliland (R)	Chris Lawson
17	Chevrolet	Steve McGowan	David Mayhew 2	Johnny White 1
17	Chevrolet	Steve McGowan	David Mayhew 2	Corey LaJoie 1
18	Toyota	Becky Kann	Bill Kann 3	Billy Kann 2
18	Toyota	Becky Kann	Bill Kann 3	Chris Lawson 1
19	Toyota	Bill McAnally	Riley Herbst (R)	Duane Knorr
20	Chevrolet 2	Bob Newberry 2	Blaine Rocha (R) 2	Willie Allen 2
20	Toyota 6	Bill McAnally 6	Cole Moore (R) 6	Michael Munoz 2
20	Toyota 6	Bill McAnally 6	Cole Moore (R) 6	Chris Nelle 2
20	Toyota 6	Bill McAnally 6	Cole Moore (R) 6	Roger Bracken 2
21	Chevrolet	Steve Portenga	Blaine Perkins (R)	Steve Portenga
22	Ford	Bob Bruncati	Trevor Huddleston (R) 1	Tim Huddleston 1
22	Ford	Bob Bruncati	James Bruncati (R) 1	Brett Barnett 1
24	Chevrolet	Harry Scott Jr.	Chase Elliott 1	Kris Bowen
25	Chevrolet	Harold Kunsman	Tom Klauer 1	Harold Kunsman
27	Ford	Jeff Jefferson	Gracin Raz	Jeff Jefferson
29	Chevrolet	Bob Newberry	Parker Stephens (R) 2	Duane Sharp
30	Ford	Kent Smith	Ron Norman 12	Christopher Thomas 11; Roger Bracken 3
30	Ford	Kent Smith	Luis Vega (R) 2	Christopher Thomas 11; Roger Bracken 3
31	Chevrolet	Windi Portenga	James Cooley (R) 2	Rob Rucker
33	Toyota	Mike Behar	Nicole Behar 4	Mike Behar
36	Chevrolet 8	Kevin McCarty	Jesse Iwuji (R)	Joe Ransom 13
36	Toyota 6	Kevin McCarty	Jesse Iwuji (R)	Stafford Smith 1
38	Ford 6 Toyota 4 Chevrolet 4	Mike Holleran	Colton Nelson (R) 3	Dave Hansen 2 Sonny Wahl 1 Jason Heggemeier 1 David McKay Jr. 1 Ron Cortez 1 Kent Smith 6 Kevin McCarty 1 John Wood 1
38	Ford 6 Toyota 4 Chevrolet 4	Mike Holleran	Stafford Smith (R) 9 (Note: Stafford Smith drove in the Casey's General Store 150 with car number 08.)	Dave Hansen 2 Sonny Wahl 1 Jason Heggemeier 1 David McKay Jr. 1 Ron Cortez 1 Kent Smith 6 Kevin McCarty 1 John Wood 1
38	Ford 6 Toyota 4 Chevrolet 4	Mike Holleran	Rich DeLong Jr. 1	Dave Hansen 2 Sonny Wahl 1 Jason Heggemeier 1 David McKay Jr. 1 Ron Cortez 1 Kent Smith 6 Kevin McCarty 1 John Wood 1
38	Ford 6 Toyota 4 Chevrolet 4	Mike Holleran	Salvatore Iovino (R) 1	Dave Hansen 2 Sonny Wahl 1 Jason Heggemeier 1 David McKay Jr. 1 Ron Cortez 1 Kent Smith 6 Kevin McCarty 1 John Wood 1
39	Toyota 9 Chevrolet 1	Nick Sommers	Dan Phillippi (R) 4	Kevin McCarty 4 Dave McKay 1 Mike Holleran 1 Darrel Pederson 2 Nick Sommers 2
39	Toyota 9 Chevrolet 1	Nick Sommers	Salvatore Iovino (R) 6	Kevin McCarty 4 Dave McKay 1 Mike Holleran 1 Darrel Pederson 2 Nick Sommers 2
40	Chevrolet	Michael Hillman	Brian Wong 1	Mardy Lindley
42	Ford	Sonny Wahl	Larry Hull (R) 1	Travis Anderson
47	Toyota	Michelle Ivie	Scott Ivie 3	Mike D'Arcy
50	Toyota	Bill McAnally	Chris Eggleston	Ty Joiner
51	Chevrolet	Carlos Vieira	Carlos Vieira 1	Travis Bryans
54	Toyota	Bill McAnally 2	Julia Landauer (R)	Mario Isola
54	Toyota	Mike Curb 12	Julia Landauer (R)	Mario Isola
55	Ford	Dione Jefferson	Hannah Newhouse (R) 2	Jason Jefferson
55	Ford	Dione Jefferson	Buddy Shepherd (R) 1	Jason Jefferson
55	Ford	Dione Jefferson	Garret Archer (R) 1	Jason Jefferson
55	Ford	Dione Jefferson	Vanessa Robinson (R) 2	Jason Jefferson
61	Ford 2	Richard Thompson	Johnny Borneman 3	Will Harris
61	Chevrolet 1	Richard Thompson	Johnny Borneman 3	Will Harris
64	Chevrolet	Richard DeLong 1	Rich DeLong Jr. 5	Richard Walker 4
64	Chevrolet	Danny Fascovicz 4	Rich DeLong Jr. 5	Jason DeLong 1
68	Chevrolet	Jenise Kneeland	Rodd Kneeland (R) 1	Jim Weiler
77	Chevrolet	Joe Nava	Juan Esteban Garcia (R) 3	Charles Price
83	Chevrolet	Todd Havens	Braeden Havens 2	Travis Sharpe
83	Chevrolet	Todd Havens	Alan Cress (R) 1	Travis Sharpe
84	Chevrolet	Richard DeLong 1 Cindy DeLong 12	Rich DeLong III 12	Willian Loe 1 Chris Dittes 12
84	Chevrolet	Richard DeLong 1 Cindy DeLong 12	Will Rodgers (R) 1	Willian Loe 1 Chris Dittes 12
86	Chevrolet	Tim Spurgeon	Tim Spurgeon 3	Mike Davis 1
86	Chevrolet	Tim Spurgeon	Tim Spurgeon 3	Jim Brown 2
86	Chevrolet	Tim Spurgeon	Hollis Thackeray (R) 1	Hollis Thackeray 1
88	Ford	Troy Cline	Alex Schutte 1	Troy Cline
91	Ford	Courtney O'Donnell	Dan O'Donnell (R) 3	Willian Loe

== Schedule ==
All of the races in the 2016 season were televised on NBCSN and were on a tape delay basis.

No.	Race title	Track	Date
1	Toyota/NAPA Auto Parts 150	Irwindale Speedway, Irwindale, California	March 19
2	NAPA Auto Parts 150	Kern County Raceway Park, Bakersfield, California	April 2
3	NAPA Auto Parts Wildcat 150	Tucson Speedway, Tucson, Arizona	May 7
4	Sunrise Ford 150	Orange Show Speedway, San Bernardino, California	May 21
5	Toyota/NAPA Auto Parts 150	Colorado National Speedway, Dacono, Colorado	June 11
6	Chevy's Fresh Mex 200	Sonoma Raceway, Sonoma, California	June 25
7	Toyota/NAPA Auto Parts 150	Stateline Speedway, Post Falls, Idaho	July 9
8	Casey's General Store 150 (Note: The Casey's General Store 150 was held as a combined event, with competitors from the K&N Pro Series West competing along with competitors for the K&N Pro Series East. The race was run with a series-based point distribution, where drivers receive points and statistical credit for their finish relative to other drivers in their series, not to the whole field in general.)	Iowa Speedway, Newton, Iowa	July 29
9	NAPA Auto Parts 150	Evergreen Speedway, Monroe, Washington	August 13
10	Toyota/NAPA Auto Parts 150	Douglas County Speedway, Roseburg, Oregon	August 27
11	UMC 110 presented by Ken Garff Volvo	Utah Motorsports Campus, Tooele, Utah	September 10–11
12	UMC 110 presented by Ken Garff Volvo	Utah Motorsports Campus, Tooele, Utah	September 10–11
13	NAPA Auto Parts Idaho 208	Meridian Speedway, Meridian, Idaho	September 24
14	Toyota/NAPA Auto Parts 150 presented by TriCo Welding Supplies	All American Speedway, Roseville, California	October 15

== Results and standings ==
=== Races ===
No.	Race	Pole position	Most laps led	Winning driver	Manufacturer
1	Toyota/NAPA Auto Parts 150	Todd Gilliland	Gracin Raz	Todd Gilliland	Toyota
2	NAPA Auto Parts 150	Todd Gilliland	Todd Gilliland	Todd Gilliland	Toyota
3	NAPA Auto Parts Wildcat 150	Ryan Partridge	Ryan Partridge	Ryan Partridge	Ford
4	Sunrise Ford 150	Ryan Partridge	Ryan Partridge	Chris Eggleston	Toyota
5	Toyota/NAPA Auto Parts 150	Todd Gilliland	Chris Eggleston	Chris Eggleston	Toyota
6	Chevy's Fresh Mex 200	Chase Elliott	Noah Gragson	Chase Elliott	Chevrolet
7	Toyota/NAPA Auto Parts 150	Chris Eggleston	Chris Eggleston	Todd Gilliland	Toyota
8	Casey's General Store 150	Todd Gilliland	Todd Gilliland	Todd Gilliland	Toyota
9	NAPA Auto Parts 150	Todd Gilliland	Todd Gilliland	Todd Gilliland	Toyota
10	Toyota/NAPA Auto Parts 150	Todd Gilliland	Todd Gilliland	Ryan Partridge	Ford
11	UMC 110 presented by Ken Garff Volvo	Ryan Partridge	Ryan Partridge	Noah Gragson	Ford
12	UMC 110 presented by Ken Garff Volvo	Ryan Partridge^{1}	Todd Gilliland	Noah Gragson	Ford
13	NAPA Auto Parts Idaho 208	Ryan Partridge	Ryan Partridge	Todd Gilliland	Toyota
14	Toyota/NAPA Auto Parts 150 presented by TriCo Welding Supplies	Todd Gilliland^{2}	Ryan Partridge	Ryan Partridge	Ford

Notes

- ^{1} – Qualifying was set by the fastest lap times from Saturday's race.
- ^{2} – The qualifying session for the Toyota/NAPA Auto Parts 150 presented by TriCo Welding Supplies was cancelled due to weather. The starting line-up was decided by Owners' championship.

=== Drivers' championship ===
(key) Bold – Pole position awarded by time. Italics – Pole position set by final practice results or 2015 Owner's points. * – Most laps led.

Pos	Driver	IRW	KER	TUC	ORG	CNS	SON	SLN	IOW	EVG	DCO	UMC	UMC	MER	AAS	Points
1	Todd Gilliland **(R)**	**1**	**1***	2	4	**2**	24	1	1*	**1***	**6***	2	2*	1	8	594
2	Ryan Partridge	2	2	**1***	**6***	4	4	10	5	5	1	**9***	**3**	**11***	1*	581
3	Noah Gragson	4	8	9	3	10	2*	2	13	16	4	1	1	6	4	552
4	Julia Landauer **(R)**	8	10	5	5	6	11	5	17	8	5	4	8	2	3	528
5	Gracin Raz	14*	7	16	2	3	3	4	9	4	2	3	11	5	18	524
6	Chris Eggleston	3	5	3	1	1*	26	**3***	25	2	7	21	19	9	2	518
7	Riley Herbst **(R)**	6	4	7	16	13	5	7	6	3	3	5	4	19	12	510
8	Cole Rouse **(R)**	9	3	4	14	9	10	6	12	6	12	10	9	4	6	509
9	Blaine Perkins **(R)**	18	16	8	9	5	21	11	16	7	8	6	6	10	9	475
10	Jesse Iwuji **(R)**	20	14	15	10	16	15	18	27	15	18	13	12	18	16	404
11	Ron Norman	13	11	10	7	7	22	15	23	12	9			12	11	390
12	Rich DeLong III	22	12	14	12		27	19		17	11	12	14	8	Wth	316
13	Stafford Smith **(R)**			11		11	28	13	Wth		19	14	10	7	20	263
14	Matt Levin	19	17	6	8	8	14	9	31							258
15	John Wood	16	13	13	11	15		12						17	15	240
16	Will Rodgers **(R)**					Wth	17	8	24	14		7	7			201
17	Cole Moore **(R)**					14		14		10		18	17		7	184
18	Salvatore Iovino **(R)**							17		21	16	16	16	21	22	179
19	Dan Phillippi **(R)**				17	12			28	19				20	10	173
20	Nicole Behar									9	10			3	5	149
21	Colton Nelson **(R)**	11	20								17			13	23	136
22	Todd Souza	24	Wth				16					11	5		Wth	120
23	Jack Sellers	15	21				20								14	106
24	Takuma Koga	17	23				13			20						103
25	Scott Ivie						8					15	13			96
26	Tim Spurgeon						12					8	18			94
27	Johnny Borneman III	5	9				29									89
28	Bill Kann									13	20				17	82
29	Sting Ray Robb **(R)**											17	20	14		81
30	Rich DeLong Jr.				13			Wth				20	21	Wth	Wth	78
31	Hannah Newhouse **(R)**	7												16		65
32	Braeden Havens							16		11						61
33	Parker Stephens **(R)**	12	18													58
34	David Mayhew		6				30									54
35	Luis Vega **(R)**											19	15			54
36	Vanessa Robinson **(R)**										15				21	52
37	Juan Esteban Garcia **(R)**	23	15	Wth												50
38	Chase Elliott						**1**									47
39	Blaine Rocha **(R)**	21	22													45
40	Michael Shawhan **(R)**						6									38
41	Tom Klauer						7									37
42	Carlos Vieira						9									35
43	Trevor Huddleston **(R)**	10														34
44	Christian Celaya			12					21^{2}							32
45	Alan Cress **(R)**										13					31
46	Hollis Thackeray **(R)**														13	31
47	Andrew Koens **(R)**										14					30
48	Dan O'Donnell **(R)**	Wth			15									Wth		29
49	Larry Hull **(R)**													15		29
50	Rodd Kneeland **(R)**						18									26
51	Garret Archer **(R)**									18						26
52	Buddy Shepherd **(R)**		19													25
53	James Bruncati **(R)**						19									25
54	Alex Malycke **(R)**														19	25
55	Jack Chisholm									22						22
56	James Cooley **(R)**											Wth	Wth^{3}			22
57	Brian Wong						23									21
58	Alex Schutte						25									19
59	Jim Inglebright						DNS^{1}									13
Drivers ineligible for K&N Pro Series West points
	Kyle Benjamin								**2**							
	Austin Theriault								3							
	Collin Cabre								4							
	Justin Haley								7							
	Hunter Baize **(R)**								8							
	John Holleman IV **(R)**								10							
	Jesse Little								11							
	Tyler Dippel **(R)**								14							
	Spencer Davis **(R)**								15							
	Dominique Van Wieringen **(R)**								18							
	Trey Hutchens								19							
	Jairo Avila Jr. **(R)**								20							
	Justin Fontaine								22							
	Harrison Burton **(R)**								26							
	Ali Kern **(R)**								29							
	Chad Finchum								30							
	Grant Quinlan **(R)**								32							
	Rubén García Jr. **(R)**								33							
Pos	Driver	IRW	KER	TUC	ORG	CNS	SON	SLN	IOW	EVG	DCO	UMC	UMC	MER	AAS	Points

Notes

- ^{1} – Jim Inglebright received championship points, despite the fact that he did not start the race.
- ^{2} – Scored points towards the K&N Pro Series East.
- ^{3} – James Cooley received championship points, despite the fact that he withdrew prior to the race.

== See also ==
- 2016 NASCAR Sprint Cup Series
- 2016 NASCAR Xfinity Series
- 2016 NASCAR Camping World Truck Series
- 2016 NASCAR K&N Pro Series East
- 2016 NASCAR Whelen Modified Tour
- 2016 NASCAR Whelen Southern Modified Tour
- 2016 NASCAR Pinty's Series
- 2016 NASCAR Whelen Euro Series
