= Brian Wong (racing driver) =

American racing driver (born 1989)

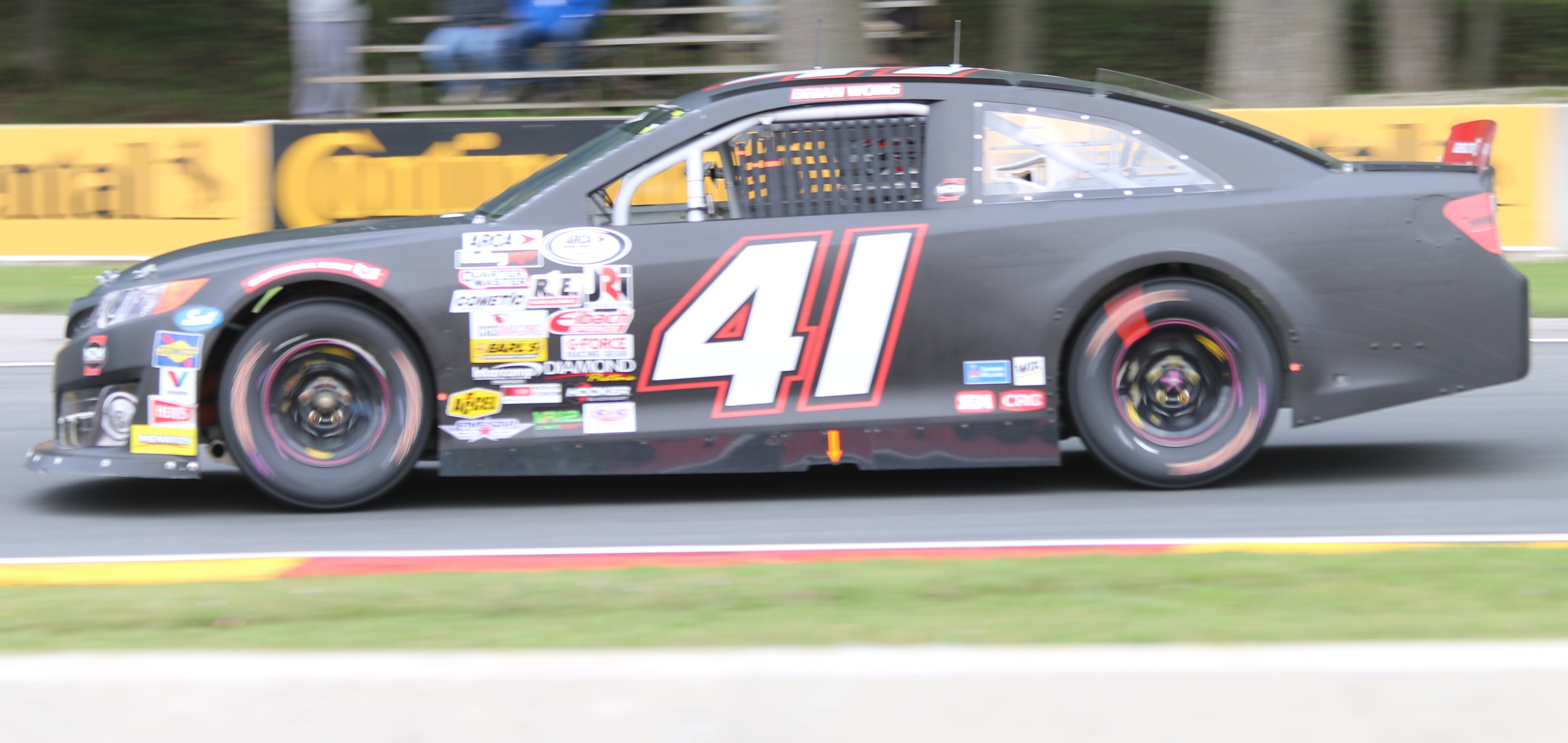
- Wong racing at Road America in 2017
- Born: February 3, 1989 (age 37); Newport Beach, California, U.S.

NASCAR FedEx Freight Truck Series career
- 2 races run over 2 years
- 2017 position: 54th
- Best finish: 54th (2017)
- First race: 2015 Chevrolet Silverado 250 (Mosport)
- Last race: 2017 Chevrolet Silverado 250 (Mosport)
Wins	Top tens	Poles
0	0	0

Brian Wong (born February 3, 1989) is an American professional stock car racing driver. He last competed part-time in the NASCAR Camping World Truck Series and the ARCA Racing Series.

== Racing career ==
=== NASCAR Camping World Truck Series ===
Wong began his Truck Series career in 2015, driving the No. 25 Toyota Tundra for Venturini Motorsports at Bowmanville. He finished 12th, and this was his only race for the season.

Wong returned to the Truck Series in 2017, driving the No. 99 Chevrolet Silverado for MDM Motorsports. He again competed in the Bowmanville race and finished 12th.

=== NASCAR K&N Pro Series West ===
Wong’s NASCAR career first began in the K&N West Series in 2008, where he drove the No. 89 Chevrolet for his own team, Speed Wong Racing, in four races. Wong has competed six years in the West Series, with a best ranking in points standings of 20th in 2009.

=== NASCAR K&N Pro Series East ===
Wong participated in two races in the East Series, one each in 2009 and 2015. In 2009, he drove the No. 89 Dodge and in 2015, he drove the No. 40 Chevrolet.

=== ARCA Racing Series ===
Wong has run one race each in 2013, 2014, 2015, and 2017 in the ARCA Racing Series. Three of the races were at Millville, and the last was at Road America.

=== Other series ===
Wong also competed in Porsche Carrera Cup Asia and American Le Mans Series.

== Motorsports career results ==
=== NASCAR ===
(key) (Bold – Pole position awarded by qualifying time. Italics – Pole position earned by points standings or practice time. * – Most laps led.)

==== Camping World Truck Series ====
NASCAR Camping World Truck Series results
Year	Team	No.	Make	1	2	3	4	5	6	7	8	9	10	11	12	13	14	15	16	17	18	19	20	21	22	23	NCWTC	Pts	Ref
2015	Venturini Motorsports	25	Toyota	DAY	ATL	MAR	KAN	CLT	DOV	TEX	GTW	IOW	KEN	ELD	POC	MCH	BRI	MSP; 12	CHI	NHA	LVS	TAL	MAR	TEX	PHO	HOM	59th	32	
2017	MDM Motorsports	99	Chevy	DAY	ATL	MAR	KAN	CLT	DOV	TEX	GTW	IOW	KEN	ELD	POC	MCH	BRI	MSP; 12	CHI	NHA	LVS	TAL	MAR	TEX	PHO	HOM	54th	25	

==== K&N Pro Series East ====
NASCAR K&N Pro Series East results
Year	Team	No.	Make	1	2	3	4	5	6	7	8	9	10	11	12	13	14	NKNPSEC	Pts	Ref
2009	Speed Wong Racing	89	Dodge	GRE	TRI	IOW	SBO	GLN; 9	NHA	TMP	ADI	LRP	NHA	DOV				52nd	138	
2015	Ranier Racing with MDM	40	Chevy	NSM	GRE	BRI	IOW	BGS	LGY	COL	NHA	IOW	GLN; 22	MOT	VIR	RCH	DOV	59th	22	

==== K&N Pro Series West ====
NASCAR K&N Pro Series West results
Year	Team	No.	Make	1	2	3	4	5	6	7	8	9	10	11	12	13	14	15	NKNPSWC	Pts	Ref
2008	Speed Wong Racing	89	Chevy	AAS	PHO	CTS	IOW	CNS	SON; 16	IRW; 30	DCS	EVG	MMP; 14	IRW; 26	AMP	AAS			27th	394	
2009	Speed Wong Racing	89	Toyota	CTS	AAS	PHO	MAD	IOW	DCS	SON; 32	IRW; 18				IOW; 14	AAS			20th	619	
2009	Speed Wong Racing	89	Dodge									PIR; 3*	MMP; 6	CNS					20th	619	
2010	Speed Wong Racing	89	Toyota	AAS	PHO; 23	IOW	DCS		IRW; 26						PHO; 24				27th	449	
2010	Speed Wong Racing	89	Dodge					SON; 30		PIR; 19	MRP	CNS	MMP	AAS					27th	449	
2011	Speed Wong Racing	89	Dodge	PHO	AAS	MMP; 7	IOW	LVS											35th	401	
2011	Speed Wong Racing	89	Toyota						SON; 5	IRW	EVG	PIR	CNS	MRP	SPO	AAS	PHO; 21		35th	401	
2012	Speed Wong Racing	89	Toyota	PHO	LHC	MMP; 11	S99	IOW	BIR	LVS	SON	EVG	CNS	IOW	PIR; 7	SMP	AAS	PHO; 16	28th	98	
2016	Ranier Racing with MDM	40	Chevy	IRW	KCR	TUS	OSS	CNS	SON; 23	SLS	IOW	EVG	DCS	MMP	MMP	MER	AAS		56th	21	

=== ARCA Racing Series ===
(key) (Bold – Pole position awarded by qualifying time. Italics – Pole position earned by points standings or practice time. * – Most laps led.)

ARCA Racing Series results
Year	Team	No.	Make	1	2	3	4	5	6	7	8	9	10	11	12	13	14	15	16	17	18	19	20	21	ARSC	Pts	Ref
2013	Venturini Motorsports	55	Toyota	DAY	MOB	SLM	TAL	TOL	ELK	POC	MCH	ROA	WIN	CHI	NJE; 7	POC	BLN	ISF	MAD	DSF	IOW	SLM	KEN	KAN	100th	200	
2014	Venturini Motorsports	55	Toyota	DAY	MOB	SLM	TAL	TOL	NJE; 2	POC	MCH	ELK	WIN	CHI	IRP	POC	BLN	ISF	MAD	DSF	SLM	KEN	KAN		75th	220	
2015	Venturini Motorsports	15	Toyota	DAY	MOB	NSH	SLM	TAL	TOL	NJE; 20	POC	MCH	CHI	WIN	IOW	IRP	POC	BLN	ISF	DSF	SLM	KEN	KAN		112th	130	
2017	MDM Motorsports	41	Toyota	DAY	NSH	SLM	TAL	TOL	ELK	POC	MCH	MAD	IOW	IRP	POC	WIN	ISF	ROA; 14	DSF	SLM	CHI	KEN	KAN		95th	155	
