= Vito Cancilla =

American racing driver

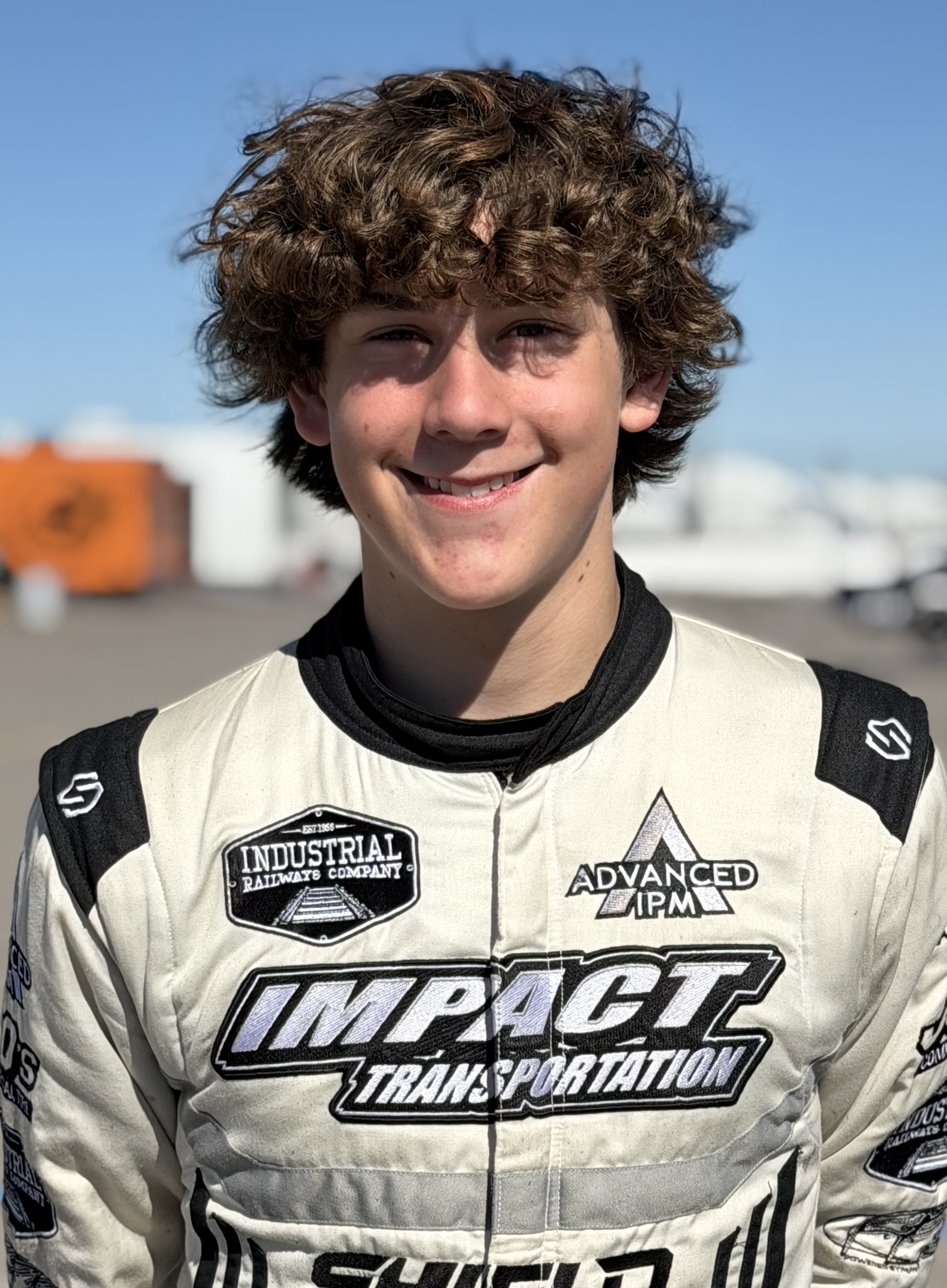
- Cancilla at the Las Vegas Motor Speedway Bullring in 2026
- Born: October 1, 2011 (age 15) Pleasant Hill, California, U.S.

CARS Pro Late Model Tour career
- Debut season: 2025
- Years active: 2025–present
- Starts: 6
- Championships: 0
- Wins: 0
- Poles: 0
- Best finish: 18th in 2026

ARCA Menards Series West career
- 2 races run over 1 year
- Best finish: 30th (2026)
- First race: 2026 Kyle Busch Classic (LVMS Bullring)
- Last race: 2026 NAPA Auto Parts 150 (Bakersfield)
Wins	Top tens	Poles
0	2	0
- Statistics up to date as of November 2, 2026.

Vito Cancilla (born October 1, 2011) is an American professional stock car racing driver. He currently competes in the zMAX CARS Tour and the ASA STARS National Tour, driving for Rackley W.A.R., whom he is a development driver for.

Cancilla has also competed in series such as the World Series of Asphalt Stock Car Racing, where he won the Pro Late Model division in 2026, the CARS Tour West Pro Late Model Series, the Carolina Pro Late Model Series, the CARS Tour West Super Late Model Series, and the NASCAR Weekly Series.

== Racing career ==
Cancilla first started racing at the age of five, when he raced in quarter midgets in Livermore, California. He then competed in junior Late Models, running in the 51FIFTY/MAVTV Madera Speedway Series, as well as running at All-American Speedway and the Las Vegas Motor Speedway Bullring.

In 2022, Cancilla became the youngest winner at All American Speedway at the age of ten.

In 2023, Cancilla won the track championship at All-American Speedway, as well as the track championship at Madera, having won seven of nine races in the 51Fifty Jr Late Model Series.

In 2024, Cancilla continued to run in pro late models at Roseville and Madera, where he won multiple races, and ran in series such as the SRL Southwest Tour and the CARS Tour West Limited Pro Late Model Series. It was also during this year that he became the youngest Pro Late Model winner when he won at Madera at the age of twelve, breaking Cole Custer's record of fourteen. He also raced in the Snowflake 100 at Five Flags Speedway.

In 2025, Cancilla was signed by Rackley W.A.R. as a development driver. He made his debut in the CARS Pro Late Model Tour that year, driving the No. V5 for Fetcho Motorsports at North Wilkesboro Speedway. He then returned to the series at Tri-County Speedway later that year, this time driving for Rackley WAR. It was also during this year that he ran full-time in both the CARS Tour West Pro Late Model Series and the CARS Tour West Limited Pro Late Model Series.

In 2026, Cancilla competed in the World Series of Asphalt Racing at New Smyrna Speedway, where he won the championship in the Pro Late Model division.

=== ARCA Menards Series West ===
Cancilla's No. 20 car at the Las Vegas Motor Speedway Bullring in 2026

In September 2026, it was revealed that Cancilla will make his debut in the ARCA Menards Series West at the Las Vegas Motor Speedway Bullring, driving the No. 20 Chevrolet for Bill McAnally Racing.

== Motorsports results ==
=== Stock car career summary ===
Season	Series	Team	Races	Wins	Top 5	Top 10	Points	Position
2025	CARS Pro Late Model Tour	Fetcho Motorsports	1	0	0	0	56	40th
2025	CARS Pro Late Model Tour	Rackley W.A.R.	1	0	0	0	56	40th
2026	ASA STARS National Tour	Rackley W.A.R.	2	0	0	1		
2026	CARS Pro Late Model Tour	Rackley W.A.R.	4	0	0	2	120	18th
2026	ARCA Menards Series West	Bill McAnally Racing	2	0	1	2	74	30th

=== ARCA Menards Series West ===
(key) (Bold – Pole position awarded by qualifying time. Italics – Pole position earned by points standings or practice time. * – Most laps led. ** – All laps led.)

ARCA Menards Series West results
Year	Team	No.	Make	1	2	3	4	5	6	7	8	9	10	11	12	13	AMSWC	Pts	Ref
2026	Bill McAnally Racing	20	Chevy	KER	PHO	TUC	SHA	CNS	TRI	SON	PIR	AAS	MAD	LVS; 4	PHO	KER; 10	30th	74	

=== CARS Pro Late Model Tour ===
(key)

CARS Pro Late Model Tour results
Year	Team	No.	Make	1	2	3	4	5	6	7	8	9	10	11	12	13	CPLMTC	Pts	Ref
2025	Fetcho Motorsports	V5	N/A	AAS	CDL	OCS	ACE	NWS; 15	CRW	HCY	HCY	AND	FLC	SBO			40th	56	
2025	Rackley W.A.R.	27	Chevy												TCM; 12	NWS	40th	56	
2026	Rackley W.A.R.	6C	Chevy	SNM	NSV	CRW	ACE	NWS	HCY; 18	AND							18th	120	
2026	Rackley W.A.R.	27	Chevy								FLC; 8	TCM; 15	NPS				18th	120	
2026	Rackley W.A.R.	27	Toyota											SBO; 7			18th	120	

=== ASA STARS National Tour ===
(key) (Bold – Pole position awarded by qualifying time. Italics – Pole position earned by points standings or practice time. * – Most laps led. ** – All laps led.)

ASA STARS National Tour results
Year	Team	No.	Make	1	2	3	4	5	6	7	8	9	10	11	ASNTC	Pts	Ref
2026	Rackley W.A.R.	27	Chevy	NSM	FIF	HCY; 19	SLG	MAD	NPS	OWO	TRI; 9	WIN	NSV	NSM	-*	-*	
