= Rich DeLong =

Rich DeLong may refer to:

- Rich DeLong (politician), American geologist, businessman, and politician
- Rich DeLong Jr. (born 1957), American stock car racing driver
- Rich DeLong III (born 1988), his son, American stock car racing driver

== See also ==
- Richard DeLong (1963–2020), leading figure in contemporary Sacred Harp singing
