= Ryan Partridge =

American racing driver (born 1988)

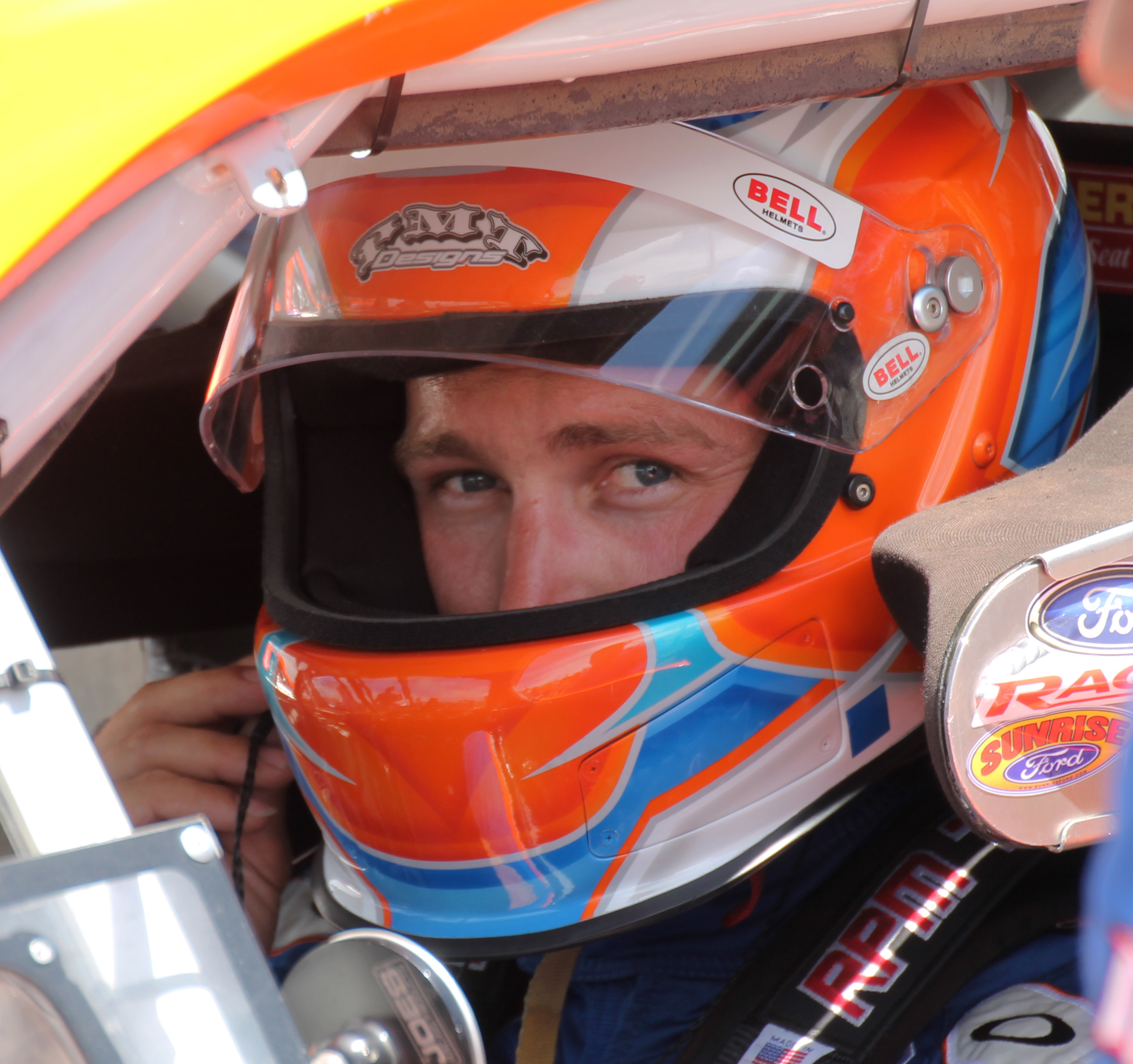
- Partridge at the 2015 Carneros 200 at Sonoma Raceway
- Born: May 17, 1988 (age 38) Rancho Cucamonga, California, U.S.

K&N Pro Series West career
- Debut season: 2012
- Current team: Sunrise Ford Racing
- Car number: 9
- Engine: Ford
- Crew chief: Jeff Schrader
- Former teams: PPL Motorsports, Kevin McCarty Racing
- Starts: 44
- Championships: 0
- Wins: 5
- Poles: 7
- Best finish: 2nd in 2016, 2018
- Finished last season: 2nd (2018)

Previous series
- 2011: Langers Juice S-2 Sportsman Series

Championship titles
- 2013–2014: Whelen All-American Series
- Statistics up to date as of October 27, 2018.

Ryan Partridge (born May 17, 1988) is an American professional stock car racing driver. He last competed in the NASCAR K&N Pro Series West, driving the No. 9 Ford Fusion for Sunrise Ford Racing. He was the Whelen All-American Series champion in 2013 and 2014.

== Racing career ==
Partridge's father was a track announcer, which led to his interest in racing. He started racing Legends in 2004.

Partridge made his K&N Pro Series West debut at Havasu 95 Speedway in April 2012. In 2013 and 2014, he won the Whelen All-American Series. He was the Whelen All-American Series California champion in 2014.

In 2015 and 2016, Partridge competed full-time in the Pro Series West. He won his first series race at Colorado National Speedway during his first year, followed by three more victories in 2016. He finished second to Todd Gilliland in the 2016 championship.

After returning to finish second in points in 2018, Partridge transitioned to a role as a driver coach and spotter for the team's 2019 driver, Jagger Jones.

== Personal life ==
Partridge was born in Rancho Cucamonga, California.

== Motorsports career results ==
=== NASCAR ===
(key) (Bold – Pole position awarded by qualifying time. Italics – Pole position earned by points standings or practice time. * – Most laps led.)

==== ARCA Menards Series West ====
ARCA Menards Series West results
Year	Team	No.	Make	1	2	3	4	5	6	7	8	9	10	11	12	13	14	15	NKNPSWC	Pts	Ref
2012	PPL Motorsports	07	Ford	PHO	LHC; 9	MMP	S99	IOW	BIR	LVS	SON	EVG	CNS	IOW	PIR	SMP	AAS; 14	PHO	40th	65	
2014	Kevin McCarty Racing	77	Toyota	PHO	IRW; 8	S99	IOW	KCR	SON	SLS	CNS	IOW	EVG	KCR	MMP	AAS	PHO		56th	37	
2015	Sunrise Ford Racing	9	Ford	KCR; 13	IRW; 5	TUS; 4*		SHA; 6	SON; 4	SLS; 4	IOW; 6	EVG; 2	**CNS**; 1*	MER; 11	AAS; 9	PHO; 12			3rd	498	
2015	Sunrise Ford Racing	91	Ford				IOW; 8												3rd	498	
2016	Sunrise Ford Racing	9	Ford	IRW; 2	KCR; 2	**TUS**; 1	**OSS**; 6*	CNS; 4	SON; 4	SLS; 10	IOW; 2	EVG; 5	DCS; 1	**MMP**; 9	**MMP**; 3	**MER**; 11	AAS; 1*		2nd	581	
2018	Sunrise Ford Racing	9	Ford	KCR; 5	TUS; 3	TUS; 2*	**OSS**; 1*	CNS; 2	SON; 5	DCS; 4	IOW; 3	EVG; 3	GTW; 10	LVS; 8	MER; 5	AAS; 2*	KCR; 2		2nd	559	
2021	Sunrise Ford Racing	51	Ford	PHO	SON	IRW	CNS	IRW; 5	PIR	LVS	AAS	PHO							42nd	39	

^{*} Season still in progress
^{1} Ineligible for series points
