= Tom Klauer =

American racing driver and team owner (born 1954)

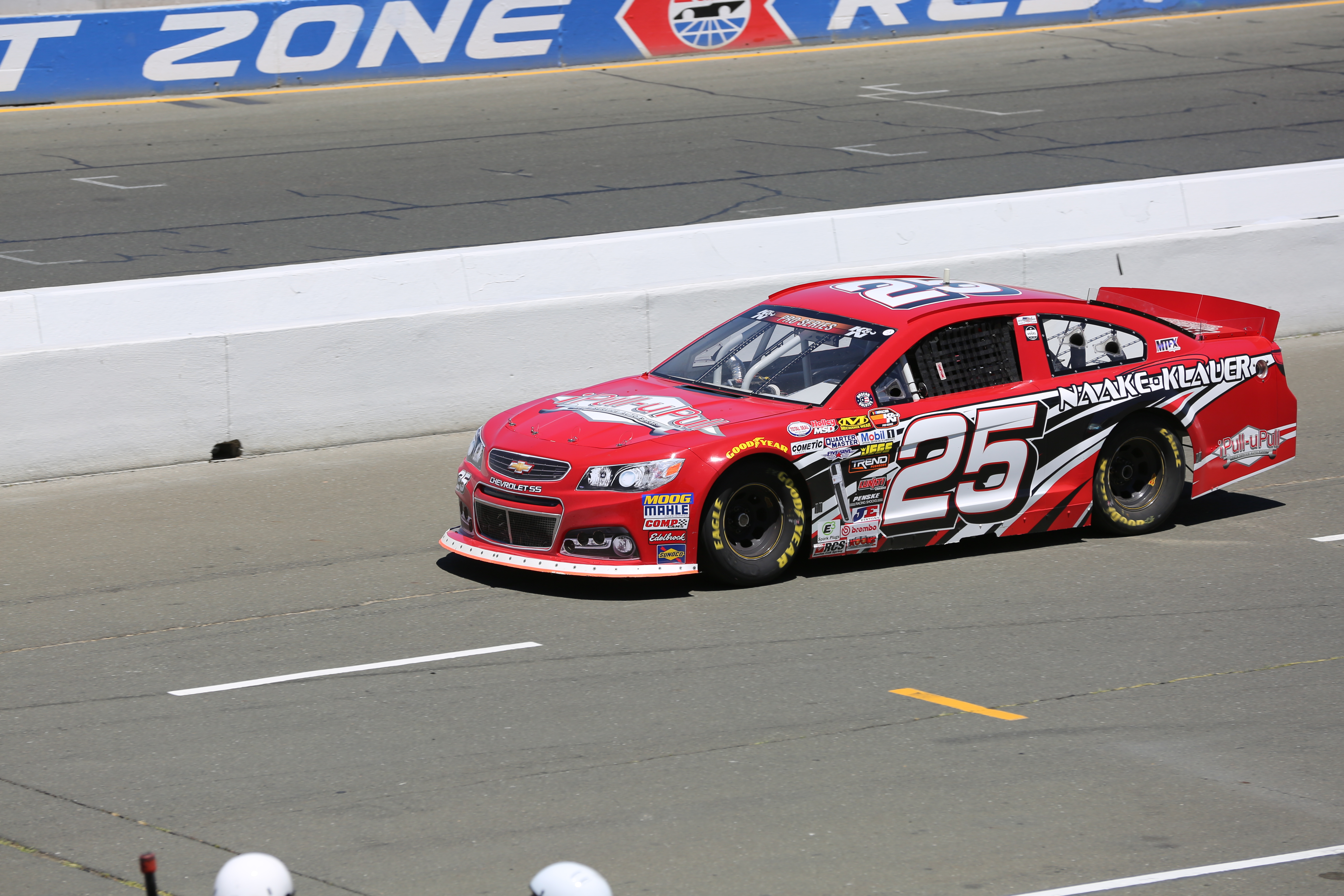
- Klauer's No. 25 car at Sonoma Raceway in 2018
- Born: September 9, 1954 (age 72); Rancho Cordova, California, U.S.

ARCA Menards Series West career
- 9 races run over 8 years
- Best finish: 41st (2016)
- First race: 2010 Bi-Mart Salute to the Troops 125 (Portland)
- Last race: 2018 Carneros 200 (Sonoma)
Wins	Top tens	Poles
0	4	0
- Statistics up to date as of November 16, 2024.

Tom Klauer (born September 9, 1954) is an American professional auto racing driver and team owner who competed in the NASCAR K&N Pro Series West from 2010 to 2018. He is also the co-owner of Naake-Klauer Motorsports, which currently competes in the ARCA Menards Series West.

Klauer has also previously competed in the Trans Am West Coast Championship.

== Motorsports results ==
=== NASCAR ===
(key) (Bold - Pole position awarded by qualifying time. Italics - Pole position earned by points standings or practice time. * – Most laps led.)

==== K&N Pro Series West ====
NASCAR K&N Pro Series West results
Year	Team	No.	Make	1	2	3	4	5	6	7	8	9	10	11	12	13	14	15	NKNPSWC	Pts	Ref
2010	Bill McAnally Racing	25	Toyota	AAS	PHO	IOW	DCS	SON	IRW	PIR; 10	MRP	CNS	MMP	AAS	PHO				60th	134	
2011	Tom Klauer	25	Chevy	PHO	AAS	MMP	IOW	LVS	SON; 37	IRW	EVG	PIR; 9	CNS	MRP	SPO	AAS	PHO		61st	190	
2012	Naake-Klauer Motorsports	25	Chevy	PHO	LHC	MMP	S99	IOW	BIR	LVS	SON	EVG	CNS	IOW	PIR; 14	SMP	AAS	PHO	65th	30	
2013	Naake-Klauer Motorsports	25	Chevy	PHO	S99	BIR	IOW	L44	SON; 20	CNS	IOW	EVG	SRP	MMP	SMP	AAS	KCR	PHO	65th	24	
2014	Naake-Klauer Motorsports	25	Chevy	PHO	IRW	S99	IOW	KCR	SON; 9	SLS	CNS	IOW	EVG	KCR	MMP	AAS	PHO		58th	35	
2015	Naake-Klauer Motorsports	25	Chevy	KCR	IRW	TUS	IOW	SHA	SON; 20	SLS	IOW	EVG	CNS	MER	AAS	PHO			63rd	24	
2016	Harold Kunzman	25	Chevy	IRW	KCR	TUS	OSS	CNS	SON; 7	SLS	IOW	EVG	DCS	UMC	UMC	MER	AAS		41st	37	
2018	Naake-Klauer Motorsports	25	Chevy	KCR	TUS	TUS	OSS	CNS	SON; 13	DCS	IOW	EVG	GTW	LVS	MER	AAS	KCR		46th	31	
