= Billy Kann =

American racing driver (born 1962)

- Born: February 4, 1962 (age 64); Tempe, Arizona, U.S.

NASCAR FedEx Freight Truck Series career
- 3 races run over 1 year
- Best finish: 80th (1997)
- First race: 2000 Grainger.com 200 (Pikes Peak)
- Last race: 2000 Sears DieHard 200 (Milwaukee)
| Wins | Top tens | Poles |
|---|---|---|
| 0 | 0 | 0 |

ARCA Menards Series West career
- 33 races run over 12 years
- Best finish: 15th (1997)
- First race: 1995 Valvoline / Checker 200 (Tucson)
- Last race: 2019 Arizona Lottery 100 (Phoenix)
| Wins | Top tens | Poles |
|---|---|---|
| 0 | 5 | 0 |
- Statistics up to date as of November 17, 2024.

Billy Kann (born February 4, 1962) is an American professional stock car racing driver who has competed in the NASCAR Craftsman Truck Series and the NASCAR K&N Pro Series West. He is the father of fellow racing driver Bill Kann, who has also competed in the West Series.

Kann has also previously competed in the United States Late Model Association and the ASA Truck Series.

== Motorsports results ==
=== NASCAR ===
(key) (Bold - Pole position awarded by qualifying time. Italics - Pole position earned by points standings or practice time. * – Most laps led.)

==== Craftsman Truck Series ====
NASCAR Craftsman Truck Series results
| Year | Team | No. | Make | 1 | 2 | 3 | 4 | 5 | 6 | 7 | 8 | 9 | 10 | 11 | 12 | 13 | 14 | 15 | 16 | 17 | 18 | 19 | 20 | 21 | 22 | 23 | 24 | NCTC | Pts | Ref |
|---|---|---|---|---|---|---|---|---|---|---|---|---|---|---|---|---|---|---|---|---|---|---|---|---|---|---|---|---|---|---|
| 2000 | Billy Kann | 13 | Chevy | DAY | HOM | PHO | MMR | MAR | PIR | GTY | MEM | PPR; 29 | EVG | TEX; 32 | KEN | GLN | MLW; 25 | NHA | NZH | MCH | IRP | NSV | CIC | RCH | DOV | TEX | CAL | 73rd | 231 | |

==== K&N Pro Series East ====
NASCAR K&N Pro Series East results
| Year | Team | No. | Make | 1 | 2 | 3 | 4 | 5 | 6 | 7 | 8 | 9 | 10 | 11 | 12 | NKNPSEC | Pts | Ref |
|---|---|---|---|---|---|---|---|---|---|---|---|---|---|---|---|---|---|---|
| 2011 | Becky Kann | 13 | Chevy | GRE | SBO | RCH | IOW; DNQ | BGS | JFC | LGY | NHA | COL | GRE | NHA | DOV | N/A | 0 | |

==== K&N Pro Series West ====
NASCAR K&N Pro Series West results
| Year | Team | No. | Make | 1 | 2 | 3 | 4 | 5 | 6 | 7 | 8 | 9 | 10 | 11 | 12 | 13 | 14 | 15 | NKNPSWC | Pts | Ref |
|---|---|---|---|---|---|---|---|---|---|---|---|---|---|---|---|---|---|---|---|---|---|
| 1995 | Billy Kann | 19 | Chevy | TUS | MMR | SON | CNS | MMR | POR | SGS | TUS; 8 | AMP | MAD | POR | LVS; 9 | SON | MMR; 15 | PHO | 28th | 256 | |
| 1996 | Billy Kann | 19 | Chevy | TUS; 31 | AMP | MMR | SON | MAD | POR | TUS; 17 | EVG | CNS | MAD | MMR | SON | MMR | PHO | LVS; 18 | 31st | 291 | |
| 1997 | Billy Kann | 19 | Chevy | TUS; 9 | AMP | SON | TUS | MMR | LVS; 8 | CAL; 13 | EVG | POR | PPR; 8 | AMP | SON | MMR; 20 | LVS; 13 | | 15th | 773 | |
| 1998 | Billy Kann | 19 | Chevy | TUS | LVS; 26 | PHO; 11 | CAL; 25 | HPT | MMR | AMP | POR | CAL | PPR; 30 | EVG | SON | MMR | LVS | | 38th | 376 | |
| 1999 | Billy Kann | 19 | Chevy | TUS | LVS; DNQ | PHO; 32 | CAL; DNQ | PPR; 24 | MMR | IRW | EVG | POR | IRW; 11 | RMR | LVS | MMR | MOT | | 38th | 371 | |
| 2008 | Becky Kann | 78 | Chevy | AAS | PHO; DNQ | CTS | IOW | CNS; 14 | SON | IRW; 20 | DCS | EVG | MMP | IRW; 20 | AMP | AAS | | | 30th | 376 | |
| 2009 | Becky Kann | 18 | Chevy | CTS | AAS | PHO; 23 | MAD | | | | | | | | IOW; 25 | AAS | | | 32nd | 300 | |
| 2009 | Central Coast Racing | 13 | Chevy | | | | | IOW; 15 | DCS | SON | IRW | PIR | MMP | CNS | | | | | 32nd | 300 | |
| 2010 | Becky Kann | 18 | Chevy | AAS | PHO; DNQ | IOW | DCS | SON | IRW; 18 | PIR | MRP | CNS | MMP | AAS | PHO; DNQ | | | | 49th | 207 | |
| 2011 | Becky Kann | 18 | Toyota | PHO; 22 | AAS | MMP | | | | IRW; 29 | EVG | PIR | CNS | MRP | SPO | AAS | PHO; DNQ | | 44th | 316 | |
| 2011 | Becky Kann | 13 | Toyota | | | | IOW; DNQ | LVS | SON | | | | | | | | | | 44th | 316 | |
| 2012 | Becky Kann | 18 | Toyota | PHO; 27 | LHC; DNQ | MMP | S99 | IOW | BIR | LVS; 25 | SON | EVG | CNS; 16 | IOW | PIR | SMP; 17 | AAS | PHO; 22 | 21st | 133 | |
| 2013 | B&B Motorsports | 18 | Toyota | PHO; 21 | S99 | BIR | IOW | L44 | SON | CNS | IOW | EVG | SRP | MMP | SMP | AAS | KCR | PHO | 66th | 23 | |
| 2018 | B&B Motorsports | 8 | Chevy | KCR | TUS | TUS | OSS | CNS | SON | DCS | IOW | EVG | GTW | LVS | MER | AAS | KCR; Wth | | N/A | 0 | |
| 2019 | B&B Motorsports | 8 | Chevy | LVS | IRW | TUS; 18 | TUS; 18 | CNS | SON | DCS | IOW | EVG | GTW | MER | AAS | KCR | PHO; 16 | | 22nd | 80 | |
