= Rich DeLong Jr. =

American racing driver (born 1957)

- Born: April 17, 1957 (age 69); North Hills, California, U.S.

ARCA Menards Series West career
- 19 races run over 8 years
- Best finish: 22nd (1995)
- First race: 1994 Valencia Dodge 200 (Saugus)
- Last race: 2016 UMC 110 Presented by Ken Garff Volvo (Tooele)
Wins	Top tens	Poles
0	2	0
- Statistics up to date as of November 18, 2024.

Richard DeLong Jr. (born April 17, 1957) is an American former professional stock car racing driver who competed in the NASCAR K&N Pro Series West from 1994 to 2016. He is the father of fellow racing driver Rich DeLong III, who has also competed in the West Series in the past.

DeLong Jr. has also competed in the NASCAR Southwest Series.

== Motorsports results ==
=== NASCAR ===
(key) (Bold - Pole position awarded by qualifying time. Italics - Pole position earned by points standings or practice time. * – Most laps led.)

==== K&N Pro Series West ====
NASCAR K&N Pro Series West results
Year	Team	No.	Make	1	2	3	4	5	6	7	8	9	10	11	12	13	14	15	NKNPSWC	Pts	Ref
1994	N/A	44	Chevy	MMR	TUS	SON	SGS; 14	YAK											33rd	349	
1994	N/A	64	Chevy						MMR; 10	POR	IND	CAJ	TCR	LVS	MMR	PHO	TUS		33rd	349	
1995	N/A	57	Chevy	TUS; 17	MMR; 16	SON	CNS; 12	MMR; 14	POR	SGS; 13	TUS	AMP	MAD	POR	LVS	SON			22nd	693	
1995	N/A	57	Olds														MMR; 23	PHO	22nd	693	
1996	N/A	84	Chevy	TUS	AMP	MMR	SON	MAD	POR	TUS	EVG	CNS	MAD	MMR	SON	MMR; 19	PHO	LVS; 30	45th	179	
1997	Dick Bahre	64	Chevy	TUS	AMP	SON	TUS	MMR	LVS	CAL	EVG	POR	PPR	AMP	SON; 7	MMR; DNQ			36th	322	
1997	Dick Bahre	97	Chevy														LVS; 21		36th	322	
1999	N/A	64	Chevy	TUS	LVS	PHO	CAL	PPR	MMR	IRW	EVG	POR	IRW; 27	RMR	LVS	MMR	MOT		83rd	82	
2000	N/A	64	Chevy	PHO	MMR	LVS; 29	CAL	LAG	IRW	POR	EVG	IRW	RMR	MMR	IRW				76th	76	
2014	Bob Wood	14	Chevy	PHO	IRW	S99	IOW	KCR	SON	SLS	CNS; 16	IOW	EVG	KCR; 16					30th	80	
2014	Bob Wood	14	Ford												MMP; 20	AAS	PHO		30th	80	
2016	Kart Idaho Racing	38	Toyota	IRW	KCR	TUS	OSS; 13	CNS	SON										30th	78	
2016	DeLong Racing	64	Chevy							SLS; Wth	IOW	EVG	DCS						30th	78	
2016	Danny Fascovicz	64	Chevy											MMP; 20	MMP; 21	MER; Wth	AAS; Wth		30th	78	
