= Bill Kann =

American auto racing driver

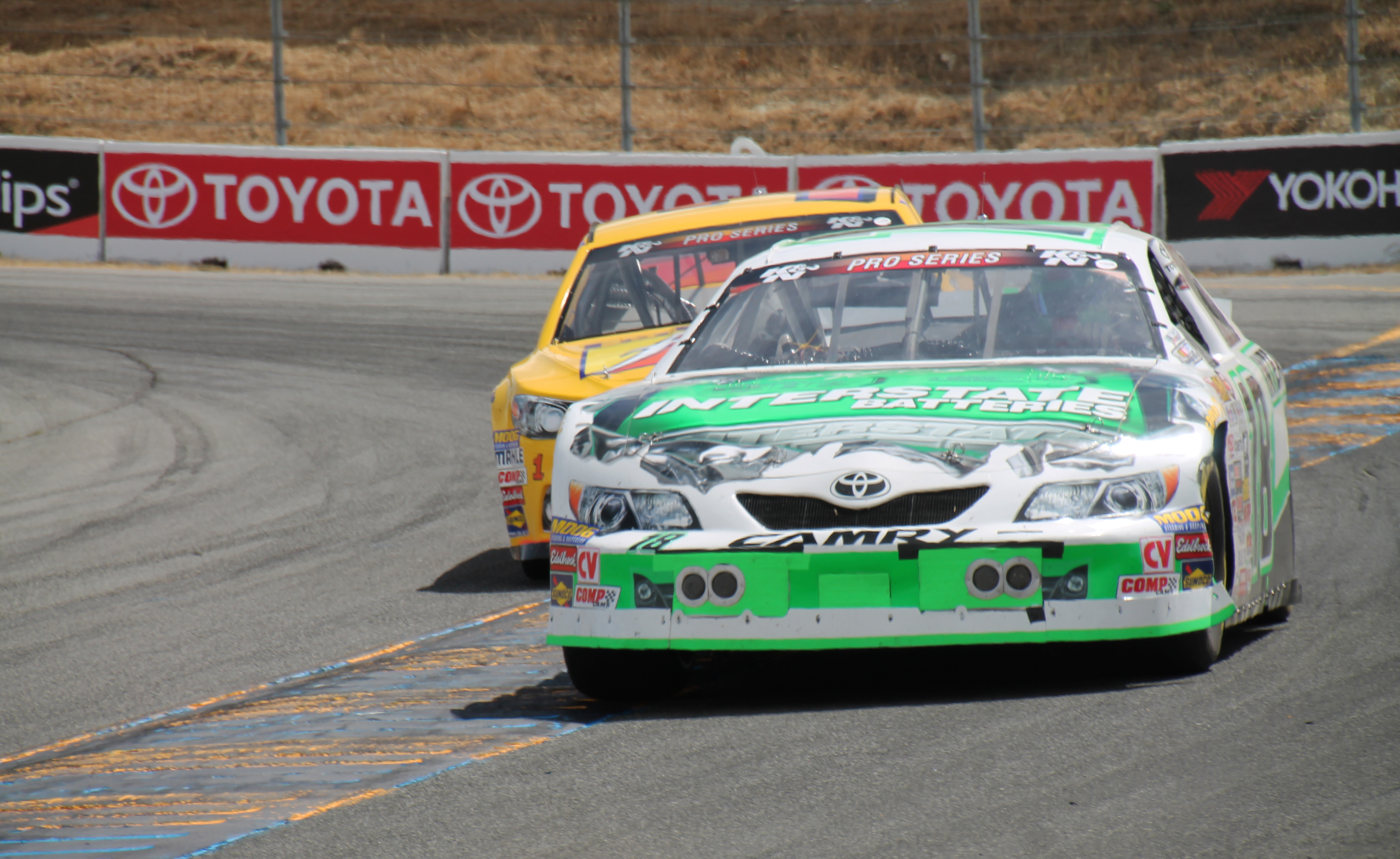
- Kann racing at the 2015 Carneros 200 at Sonoma Raceway
- Nationality: (United States) American
- Born: August 13, 1993 (age 33) Scottsdale, Arizona

NASCAR K&N Pro Series West career
- Debut season: 2013
- Current team: Becky Kann
- Car number: 18
- Engine: Toyota
- Starts: 35
- Championships: 0
- Wins: 0
- Poles: 0
- Best finish: 11th in 2018
- Finished last season: 11th
- Statistics up to date as of November 11, 2019.

Bill Kann (born August 13, 1993) is an American professional stock car racing driver. He last competed part-time in the NASCAR K&N Pro Series West, driving the No. 18 Chevrolet SS for B&B Motorsports. He is the son of former NASCAR Craftsman Truck Series and West Series driver Billy Kann.

== Motorsports career results ==
=== NASCAR ===
(key) (Bold – Pole position awarded by qualifying time. Italics – Pole position earned by points standings or practice time. * – Most laps led.)

==== K&N Pro Series West ====
NASCAR K&N Pro Series West results
Year	Team	No.	Make	1	2	3	4	5	6	7	8	9	10	11	12	13	14	15	NKNPSWC	Pts	Ref
2013	B&B Motorsports	18	Toyota	PHO	S99	BIR	IOW	L44	SON	CNS; 16	IOW	EVG	SPO	MMP	SMP; 12	AAS	KCR	PHO	42nd	60	
2014	B&B Motorsports	18	Toyota	PHO; 21	IRW	S99	IOW	KCR; 14	SON; 29	SLS	CNS; 8	IOW	EVG	KCR	MMP; 10	AAS	PHO; 13		17th	169	
2015	B&B Motorsports	18	Toyota	KCR	IRW	TUS; 23	IOW	SHA	SON; 27	SLS	IOW	EVG	CNS	MER	AAS	PHO; DNQ			39th	48	
2016	B&B Motorsports	18	Toyota	IRW	KCR	TUS	OSS	CNS	SON	SLS	IOW	EVG; 13	DCS; 20	MMP	MMP	MER	AAS; 17		28th	82	
2017	B&B Motorsports	18	Toyota	TUS; 18	KCR; 17	IRW; 13	IRW; 17	SPO	OSS; 7	CNS; 21	SON								16th	236	
2017	B&B Motorsports	18	Chevy									IOW; 28	EVG	DCS	MER	AAS; 18	KCR; 21		16th	236	
2018	B&B Motorsports	18	Chevy	KCR; 14	TUS; 15	TUS; 13	OSS; 13	CNS	SON; 27	DCS				LVS; 13	MER	AAS	KCR; 11		11th	241	
2018	B&B Motorsports	13	Chevy								IOW; 13	EVG	GTW; 19						11th	241	
2019	B&B Motorsports	18	Chevy	LVS	IRW; 15	TUS; 17	TUS; 10	CNS	SON; 22	DCS	IOW	EVG	GTW	MER	AAS	KCR	PHO; 22		18th	134	
