= Rich DeLong III =

American racing driver

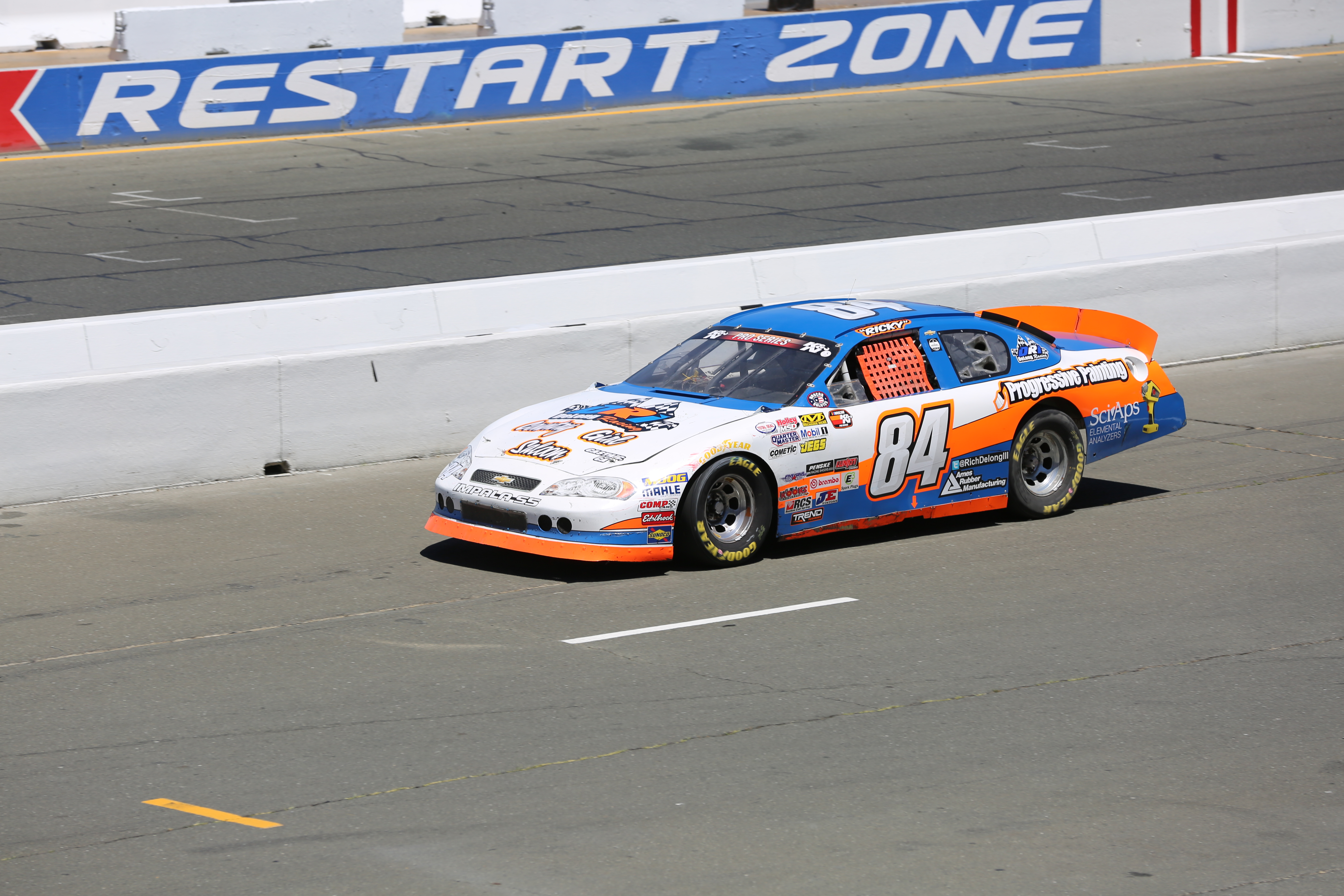
- DeLong III's No. 84 car at Sonoma Raceway in 2018
- Born: Richard Brian DeLong III; May 5, 1988 (age 38); Santa Clarita, California, U.S.

ARCA Menards Series West career
- 56 races run over 7 years
- Best finish: 8th (2014)
- First race: 2013 Talking Stick Resort 60 (Phoenix)
- Last race: 2019 Procore 200 (Sonoma)
Wins	Top tens	Poles
0	2	0
- Statistics up to date as of November 16, 2024.

Richard Brian DeLong III (born May 5, 1988) is an American professional stock car racing driver who has competed in the NASCAR K&N Pro Series West from 2013 to 2019. He is the son of fellow racing driver Rich DeLong Jr., who has also competed in the West Series in the past.

DeLong has also previously competed in the NASCAR Advance Auto Parts Weekly Series at Irwindale Speedway.

== Motorsports results ==
=== NASCAR ===
(key) (Bold - Pole position awarded by qualifying time. Italics - Pole position earned by points standings or practice time. * – Most laps led.)

==== K&N Pro Series West ====
NASCAR K&N Pro Series West results
Year	Team	No.	Make	1	2	3	4	5	6	7	8	9	10	11	12	13	14	15	NKNPSWC	Pts	Ref
2013	Dan White	01	Ford	PHO; 22	S99; DNQ	BIR	IOW	L44	SON	CNS	IOW	EVG	SPO	MMP	SMP	AAS			39th	65	
2013	Charles Silva	5	Ford														KCR; 28	PHO; DNQ	39th	65	
2014	DeLong Racing	84	Chevy	PHO; 17	IRW; 21	S99; 17		KCR; 12	SON; 20	SLS; 14	CNS; 12	IOW; 13	EVG; 14	KCR; 15	MMP; 13	AAS; 19	PHO; 17		8th	397	
2014	DeLong Racing	84	Toyota				IOW; 15												8th	397	
2015	DeLong Racing	84	Chevy	KCR; 16	IRW; 27	TUS; 20	IOW; 17	SHA; 14	SON; 21	SLS; 13		EVG; 14	CNS; 12	MER; 16	AAS; 20	PHO			13th	326	
2015	DeLong Racing	84	Ford								IOW; 12								13th	326	
2016	DeLong Racing	84	Chevy	IRW; 22	KCR; 12	TUS; 14	OSS; 12	CNS	SON; 27	SLS; 19	IOW	EVG; 17	DCS; 11	UMC; 12	UMC; 14	MER; 8	AAS; Wth		12th	316	
2017	DeLong Racing	84	Chevy	TUS; 19	KCR; 13	IRW; 15	IRW; 16	SPO; 22	OSS; 12	CNS; 13	SON; 27	IOW	EVG	DCS	MER	AAS	KCR		17th	215	
2018	DeLong Racing	84	Chevy	KCR; 18	TUS	TUS	OSS; 15	CNS	SON; 16	DCS	IOW	EVG	GTW	LVS; 22	MER	AAS; 9	KCR; 16		13th	168	
2019	DeLong Racing	84	Chevy	LVS; 15	IRW; 21	TUS	TUS	CNS	SON; 18	DCS	IOW	EVG	GTW	MER	AAS	KCR	PHO		24th	78	
