= West Series races at Utah =

ARCA Menards Series West races at Utah Motorsports Park

ENEOS/Sunrise Ford Twin 30

ARCA Menards Series West
- Venue: Utah Motorsports Campus
- Location: Grantsville, Utah
- First race: 2007
- Last race: 2020
- Distance: 66.0 mi (106.2 km)
- Laps: 30
- Previous names: Big O Tires 200 (2007); Camping World Series 125 (2008); Miller Motorsports Park 125 (2009); Toyota/NAPA Auto Parts Bonus Challenge (2010); Larry H. Miller Dealerships Utah Grand Prix (2011); Utah Grand Prix (2012) iON Camera Utah Grand Prix (2013); EnergySolutions Utah Grand Prix (2014); UMC 110 presented by Ken Garff Volvo (2016); ENEOS/Sunrise Ford Twin 30 (2020)
- Most wins (driver): Greg Pursley (3)
- Most wins (team): Gene Price Motorsports (3); Sunrise Ford Racing (3)
- Most wins (manufacturer): Ford (8)

Circuit information
- Surface: Asphalt
- Length: 2.200 mi (3.541 km)
- Turns: 15

The ARCA Menards Series West has held several races at Utah Motorsports Campus in Grantsville, Utah in 2007–2014, 2016, and 2020.

== Event information ==
Outer Course was used in 2007–2010 and 2016.

The ARCA Menards Series West races in Utah Motorsports Campus were held as double-header events in 2016 and 2020, and the double-header event in 2016 was the series' first double-header in the history.

The races were held in two different layouts, East Course and Outer Course. The races were held in East Course in 2011–2014 and 2020, while the Outer Course was used in 2007–2010 and 2016.

Races at the track have varied from 66 miles to 138 miles.

== Past winners ==
| Year | Date | Driver | Team | Manufacturer | Race distance | | Race time | Average speed (mph) |
| Year | Date | Driver | Team | Manufacturer | Laps | Miles | Race time | Average speed (mph) |
|---|---|---|---|---|---|---|---|---|
| 2007 | July 14 | Jason Bowles | Sunrise Ford Racing | Ford | 41 | 125.5 (200.8) | 1:46:57 | 70.384 |
| 2008 | August 2 | Todd Souza | Todd Souza Racing | Chevrolet | 44 (Note: Race extended due to an overtime finish.) | 134.64 (215.42) | 1:53:12 | 71.364 |
| 2009 | August 1 | Patrick Long | Sunrise Ford Racing (2) | Ford (2) | 41 | 125.5 (200.8) | 1:46:06 | 70.948 |
| 2010 | September 12 | Greg Pursley | Gene Price Motorsports | Ford (3) | 36 | 109.7 (175.52) | 1:24:26 | 77.975 |
| 2011 | April 30 | Greg Pursley | Gene Price Motorsports | Ford (4) | 63 | 138.6 (221.76) | 2:19:36 | 59.57 |
| 2012 | April 28 | Greg Pursley | Gene Price Motorsports | Ford (5) | 50 | 110 (176) | 1:39:25 | 66.387 |
| 2013 | September 14 | Andrew Ranger | NDS Motorsports | Dodge | 52 | 114.4 (183.04) | 1:36:57 | 70.799 |
| 2014 | September 28 | David Mayhew | Steve McGowan Motorsports | Chevrolet (2) | 50 | 110 (176) | 1:53:08 | 58.338 |
| 2015 | Not held | | | | | | | |
| 2016 | September 10 | Noah Gragson | Jefferson Pitts Racing | Ford (6) | 36 | 109.7 (175.52) | 1:34:29 | 69.681 |
| 2016 | September 11 | Noah Gragson | Jefferson Pitts Racing | Ford (7) | 36 | 109.7 (175.52) | 1:34:00 | 70.039 |
| 2017 – 2019 | Not held | | | | | | | |
| 2020 | June 27 | Jesse Love | Bill McAnally Racing | Toyota | 31 | 68.2 (109.12) | 1:11:17 | 57.405 |
| 2020 | June 27 | Blaine Perkins | Sunrise Ford Racing (3) | Ford (8) | 30 | 66.0 (105.6) | 0:50:02 | 79.147 |
