= The Bullring at Las Vegas Motor Speedway =

Motorsports track in the United States

- Location: 7000 North Las Vegas Boulevard; Las Vegas, Nevada, United States; 89115
- Coordinates: 36°16′17″N 115°00′40″W
- Capacity: 5,400
- Owner: Speedway Motorsports; Kevin Harvick; Tim Huddleston
- Opened: 1985; 41 years ago
- Major events: Current: ARCA Menards Series West; Kyle Busch Classic (1994–1995, 2001–2003, 2011–2012, 2020–2023, 2025–present)
- Website: www.lvmsbullring.com

Paved Oval
- Surface: Asphalt
- Length: 0.375 mi (0.604 km)
- Turns: 4
- Banking: Straights: 0° Corners: 8°

The Bullring at Las Vegas Motor Speedway (commonly known as The Bullring) is an auto racing complex in the Las Vegas, Nevada, area. The facility has hosted a variety of events, including NASCAR and CARS Tour West events. The Bullring is across the street from Las Vegas Motor Speedway.

As one of the numerous adjacent tracks to the LVMS, in 1985, the complex built a 0.33 mi (0.53 km) oval for short track races. In 2000, the track was modified to become 0.375 mi (0.604 km) and was renamed the "Bullring".

== Description ==
=== Configurations ===
The Bullring at Las Vegas Motor Speedway in its current form is measured at 0.375 mi (0.604 km), with eight degrees of banking in the turns and zero degrees of banking on the track's frontstretch and backstretch.

=== Amenities ===
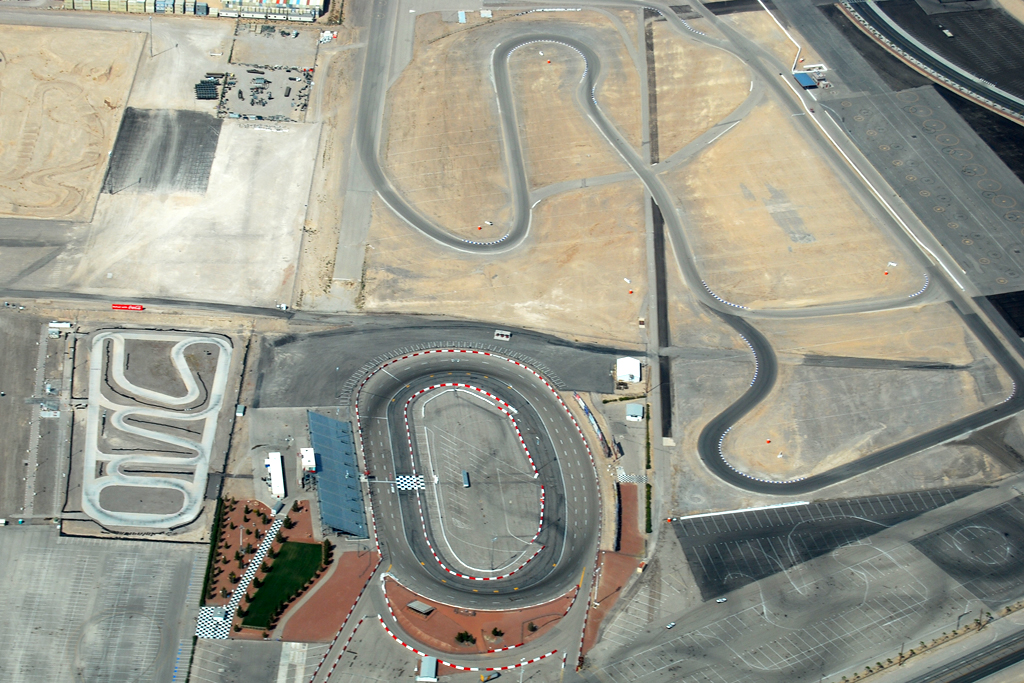
An overhead picture of The Bullring at Las Vegas Motor Speedway taken in 2008.

Like LVMS, the track is located in Las Vegas, Nevada, in-between Interstate 15 and Las Vegas Boulevard.

==== Adjacent tracks ====
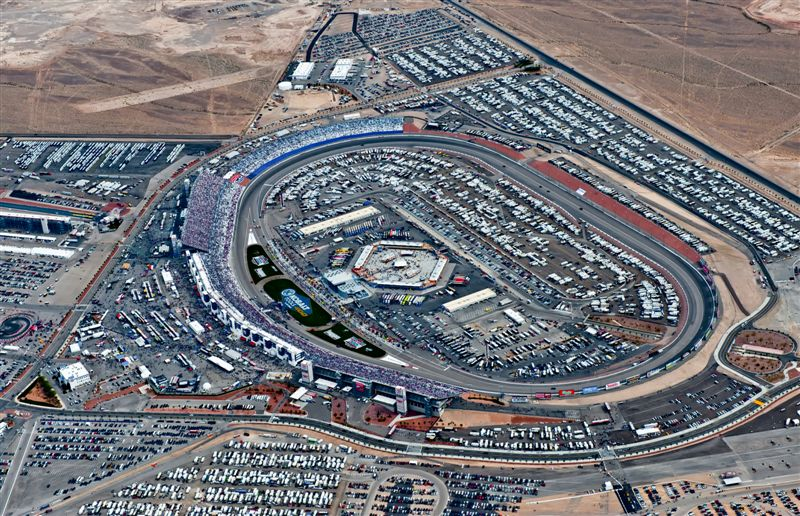
An overhead picture of Las Vegas Motor Speedway taken in 2011.

The track complex features numerous adjacent tracks; two of which were built before the main track. In 1985, the complex built the "Bullring". A 0.500 mi (0.805 km) clay dirt oval opened in November 1996, hosting a World of Outlaws event.

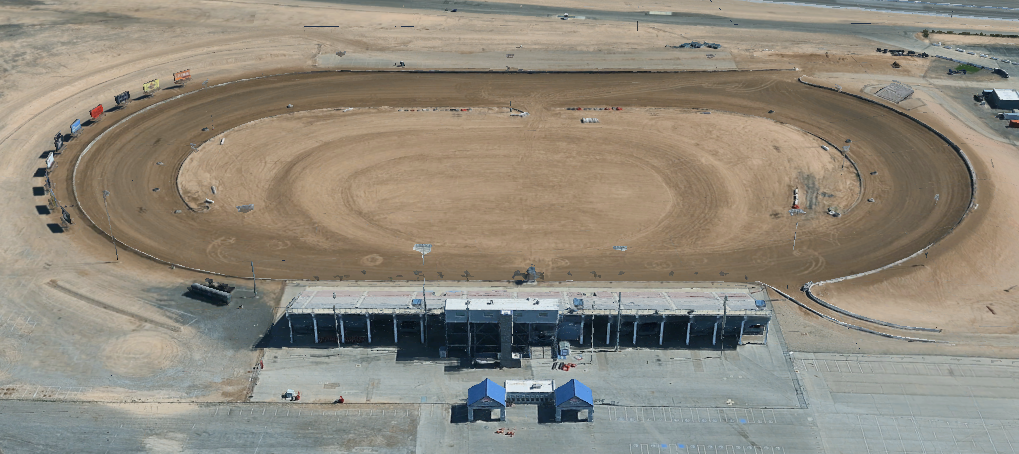
An overhead picture of The Dirt Track at Las Vegas Motor Speedway taken in 2024.

As part of the track complex's initial opening, the complex built a drag strip, which opened in 1972. In 1999, in the aftermath of Smith buying out the track, the track announced a new 0.250 mi (0.402 km) to replace the original strip built in 1972. The new drag strip opened in April 2000, being named "The Strip". In 2017, the drag strip was expanded to four lanes.

== Track history ==
In 1985, the complex built a 0.33 mi (0.53 km) oval that was assisted with donations of barriers that were used in the Caesars Palace Grand Prix.

In 2000, the track was modified to become 0.375 mi (0.604 km) and was renamed the "Bullring".

In 2026, the track had a major renovation, which included the track getting repaved.

== Events ==
=== Auto racing ===
==== ARCA Menards Series West ====
The track hosts an annual ARCA Menards Series West race, the Kyle Busch Classic.

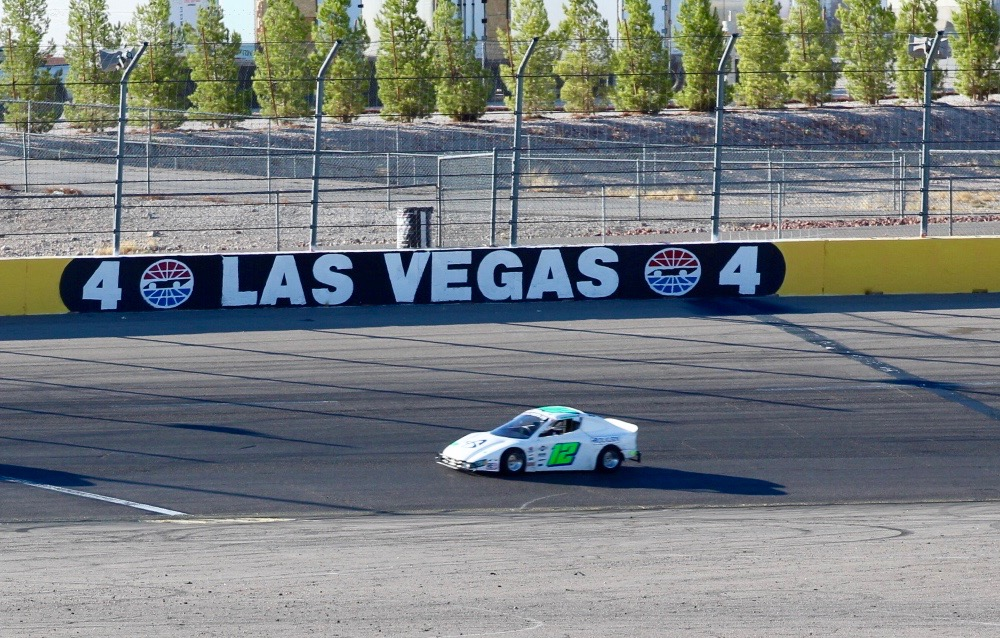
A bandolero car racing at the Bullring in 2019.

==== CARS Tour West ====
The track also hosts events in the CARS Tour West since the series' inception in 2024.
