= Kevin Harvick's Kern Raceway =

Motorsports track in the United States

- Location: 13500 Raceway Boulevard; Bakersfield, California; 93311
- Coordinates: 35°17′34″N 119°15′23″W
- Capacity: 6,000
- Owner: Tim Huddleston and Lisa Huddleston (2023–present)
- Broke ground: February 7, 2007; 19 years ago
- Opened: May 18, 2013; 13 years ago
- Former names: Kern County Raceway Park (2013–2022); Kern River Raceway (planning stages)
- Major events: Current: ARCA Menards Series West; West Series races at Kern (2013–2020, 2022–present)
- Website: kernraceway.com

Paved Oval (2013–present)
- Surface: Asphalt
- Length: 0.500 mi (0.805 km)
- Turns: 4
- Banking: Straights: 8° Corners: 12–14°

Dirt Oval (2015–present)
- Surface: Dirt
- Length: 0.332 mi (0.535 km)

Kevin Harvick's Kern Raceway (formerly known as the Kern County Raceway Park from 2013 to 2023 and as the Kern River Raceway in early planning stages) is an auto racing complex in the Bakersfield, California, area. The complex features various courses, including a paved oval, a dirt oval, and a motocross track. The facility has hosted a variety of events, including NASCAR and CARS Tour West events. Kern Raceway is owned and led by duo Tim Huddleston and Lisa Huddleston.

In 2006, in efforts of replacing the closed Mesa Marin Raceway, racing promoter Larry Collins announced plans to build a replacement track in the Bakersfield area. Construction began on the project in 2007, but after much of the construction was completed, all work on the facility was halted the following year due to financial turmoil. After the track was foreclosed in 2010, the facility was bought, revitalized, and completed by a group led by James Vernon and Charlie Beard in February 2012, hosting its first races in 2013. Kern Raceway added tracks within its first years, including a dirt oval and a motocross track. In 2017, the complex was listed for sale and was bought by Tim Huddleston and Lisa Huddleston in 2023.

== Description ==
=== Configuration ===
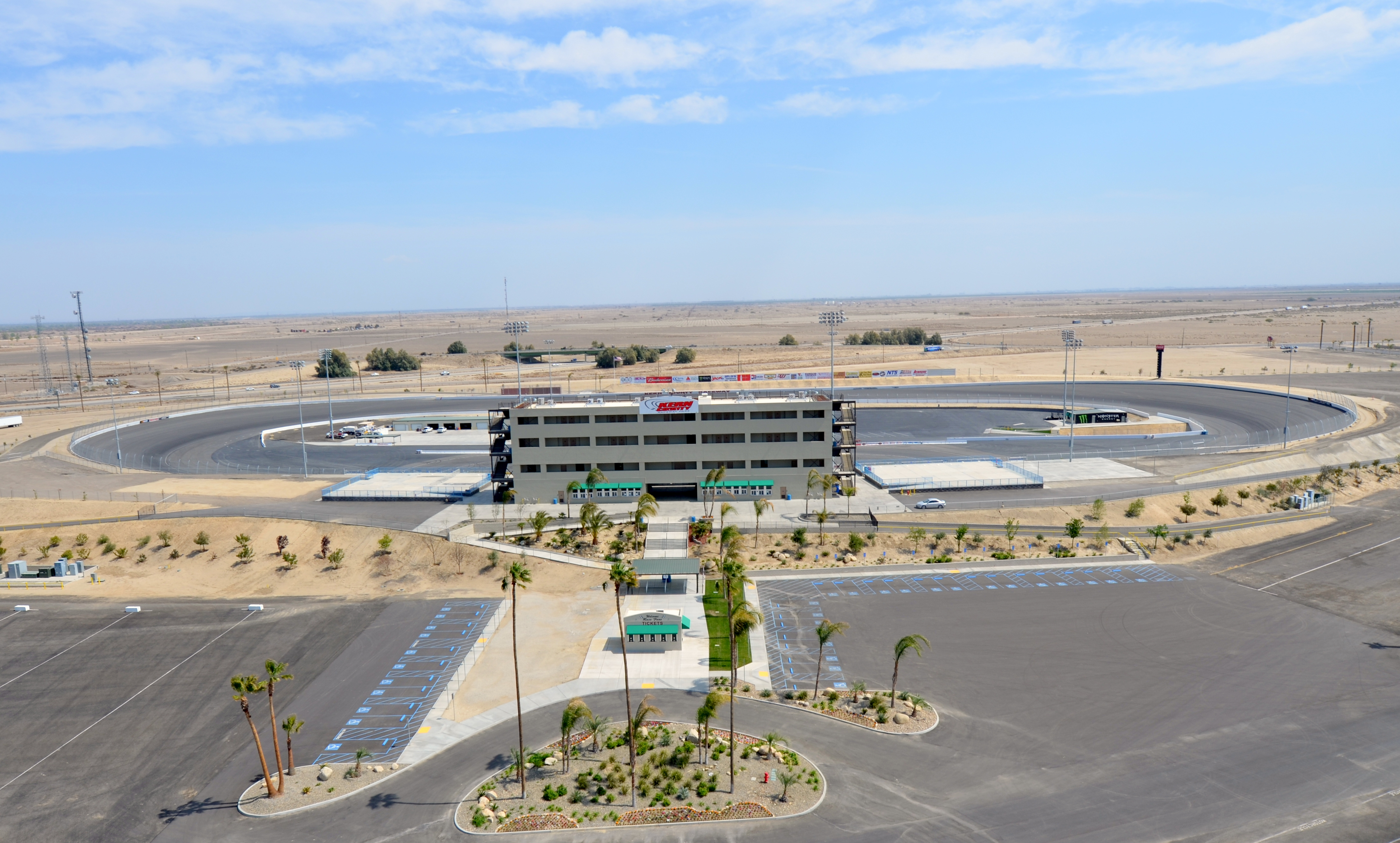
An aerial photo of Kern Raceway in 2013.

Kern Raceway is measured at 0.5 mi (0.80 km), with 8° of banking in the track's straights and a variable banking system of 12–14° in the track's corners. Alongside the main oval, the track also features two smaller oval layouts that use part of the track's infield, with layouts of 0.25 mi (0.40 km) and 0.125 mi (0.201 km).

=== Amenities ===
Kern Raceway is located in the Bakersfield, California, area, and served by Interstate 5 and California State Route 43. The paved oval of Kern Raceway has a permanent seating capacity of 6,000, with can be expanded to 17,000 with temporary seating according to track owner Tim Huddleston. Alongside the paved oval, the complex also features a 1/3 mi (0.54 km) clay oval and a motocross track. The clay oval, formally named the Bakersfield Speedway, has a capacity of 2,704 according to The Bakersfield Californian. Like the paved oval, the track also features two smaller layouts that use the track's infield. The motocross track, formally named "Kern County Raceway Park MX", was opened in October 2014. In total, the entire Kern Raceway complex is situated on 120 acres (49 ha) of land according to various outlets.

== Track history ==
=== Track announcement, initial foreclosure ===
After the closure of Mesa Marin Raceway in 2005, Larry Collins, the son of Mesa Marin Raceway owner Marion Collins, announced plans to The Bakersfield Californian in February 2006 to build a track "similar to Mesa Marin but with a slight bend in the front straight and wider radius turns". In the announcement, Collins stated that he planned to build the track on an 80-acre (32 ha) plot of land owned by Alan Destefani that was formerly used as an almond farm near a junction of Interstate 5 and California State Route 43. Further announcements released two months after included seating for 5,000 and the construction of "at least a dozen luxury suites"; in comparison to Mesa Marin, the track was described by Collins as "a different approach", stating hopes of implementing modern amenities to the facility. A groundbreaking date was set for March 2006; however, it was delayed by several months due to mandatory environmental impact reviews. The Kern County Planning Commission approved construction of the facility on December 14, and groundbreaking on the facility began on February 7, 2007, with an opening date set for the spring of 2008.

==== Financial troubles, subsequent construction halt ====
By May 2007, with work beginning on crash walls and grandstands, Collins stated that he was "surprised at the speed and pace" of construction. At the end of the year, although some progress was made on paving and the erection of grandstands of the now-named Kern River Raceway, all construction stopped due to financial concerns. In January 2008, the track's opening date was moved from April of that year to June due to delays in obtaining necessary permits. Two months later, three construction subcontractors filed separate liens worth over $1.7 million after a land deal organized by Alan Destefani, the main financial backer for the project, defaulted in April 2007. In addition, Collins blamed a decline in the housing market and the subprime mortgage crisis for difficulties in obtaining a loan. After stating hopes and later failing to raise $30 million in 60 days in March, Collins admitted in May that they had "went down some paths that we shouldn’t have... we stubbed our toes a little". In July, with the companies filing liens or lawsuits increasing to five, Collins publicly announced that he was seeking private investors to fund the track to raise $32 million, with Collins stating that he was "about two-thirds of the way there" in funding. However, in December, with four civil suits levied against the project and at least $7.7 million owed in liens, a $4.5 million loan granted to the track defaulted. In April 2009, the facility was put up in a foreclosure auction for April 9. After the auction was delayed to early May, Enos Lane Farm Properties, LLC, the developer of the facility, declared Chapter 11 bankruptcy to cancel the auction in hopes of finding a potential buyer. After a potential $19 million deal with Fresno-based company CALA Holdings fell through by mid-2010, the track was officially foreclosed in June of that year, with a private investor group led by Joe Salas buying ownership of the facility.

=== Project revitalization, first events ===
After a year and a half of no work being completed on the facility, in February 2012, a group of four investors led by businessmen Dan Smith and James Vernon purchased the facility, now named as the Kern County Raceway Park (KCRP). In later interviews, Vernon's granddaughter stated that James had "literally gave his last dollar — until he had no more — to see KCRP open". According to Vernon, for over 30 days at the beginning of construction, focus was solely directed towards removing tumbleweeds. By April, work resumed on the track's infrastructure, with Smith stating that "[Kern County] has bent over backwards to help" complete the project. The following month, an opening date was set for October of that year, with work beginning on the erection of a four-story structure housing concession stands and suites. Work began on the facility's drainage systems by June, with Smith stating that the owners were "hopeful" of opening in late October. However, after delays in completing the drainage system, including a three-week delay due to removing a "clogged 48-inch (120 cm) pipe of mud and debris", Vernon admitted in late August that he did not expect KCRP to open in late October. In November, paving of the track was completed.

On December 8, NASCAR announced the scheduling of a NASCAR K&N Pro Series West (now known as the ARCA Menards Series West) race at KCRP on October 26, 2013; at this point, the facility had a planned opening date in March 2013. In January 2013, Vernon announced further opening delays to April due to additional work that owners felt was necessary "to be right when we open". It was further pushed back from April 20 to May 4 due to delays in obtaining permits in widening State Route 43. The first open test occurred on April 13, with testers Brian Richardson and Eric Richardson giving positive reviews towards the track's facilities and the track's similarity to Mesa Marin Raceway. On April 24, the official opening was delayed for a fourth time to May 18 due to more work needed for race-ready conditions; however, they planned to host a practice session open to spectators on May 4 regardless. In later interviews, Vernon stated that the delays were caused by unexpected high costs, which was eventually offset from further funding from businessman Charlie Beard; Beard refused to disclose the total cost of KCRP. According to The Bakersfield Californian's Mike Griffith, Beard invested "millions" to the project and was the driving force for the expansion of the facility to include multiple tracks.

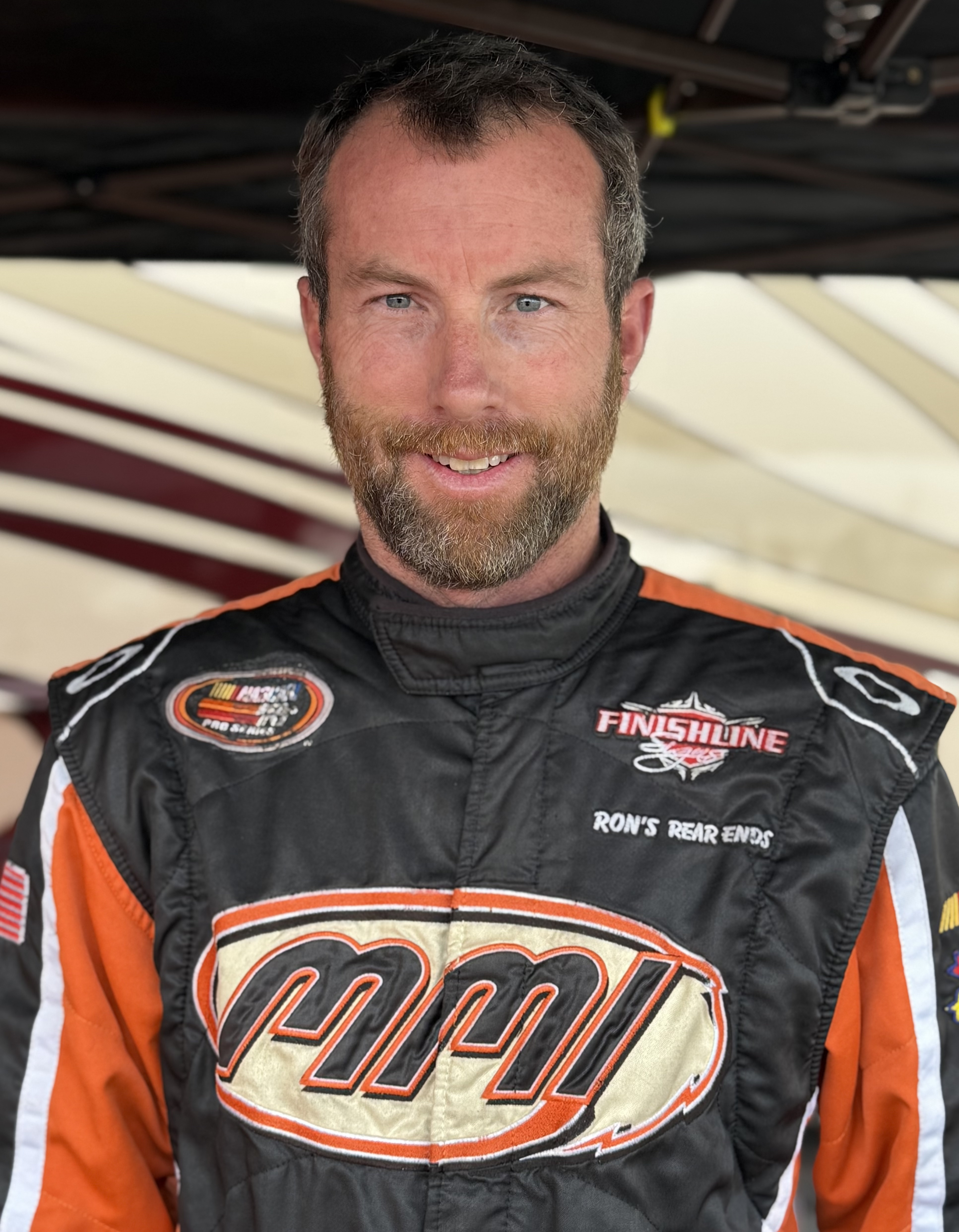
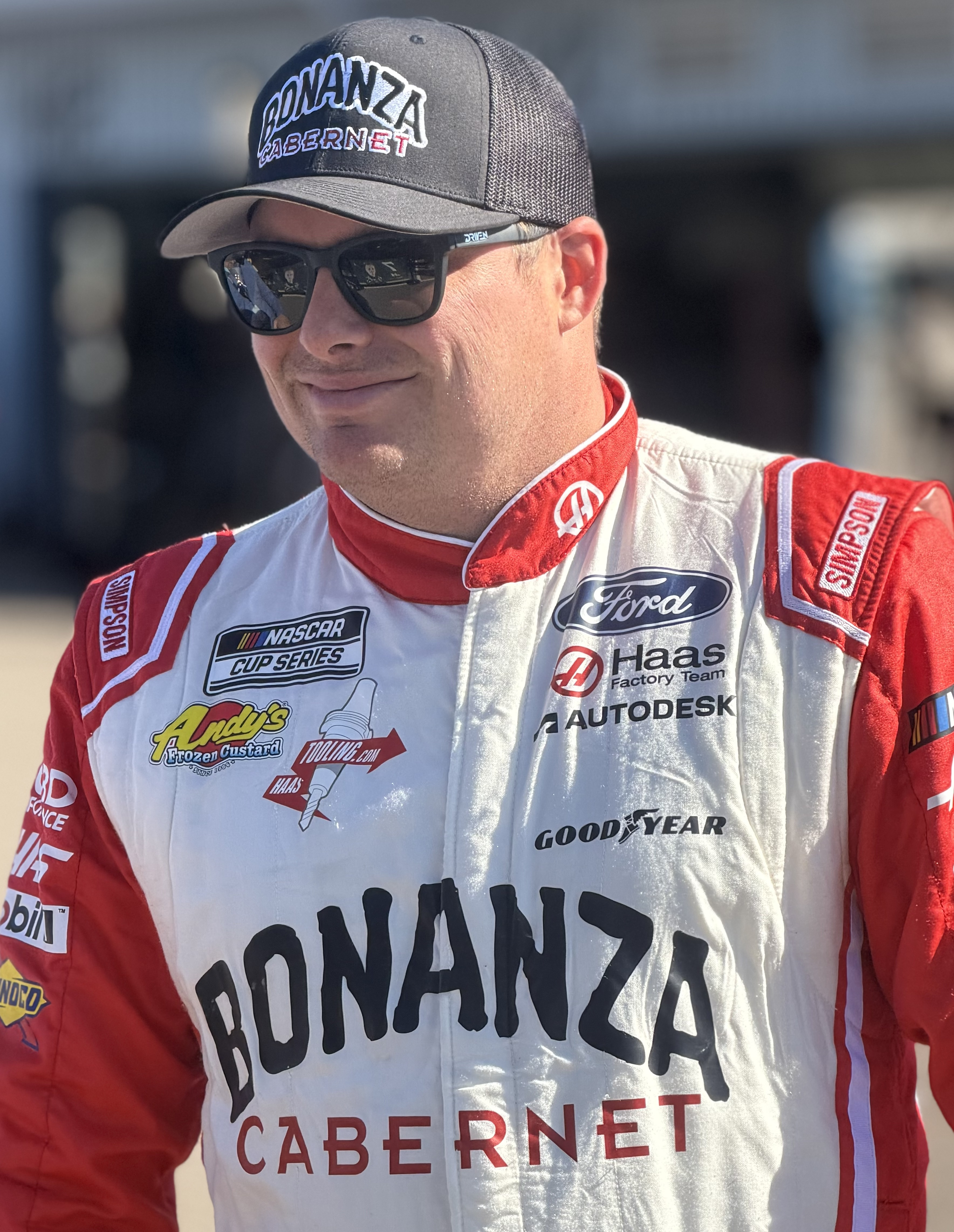
David Mayhew (left) and Cole Custer (right) won the first feature events at Kern Raceway.

KCRP formally opened on May 18, 2013, with David Mayhew and Cole Custer winning the first feature events at the track. At the time of the KCRP's opening, the facility had three oval layouts, measured at 0.5 mi (0.80 km), 0.25 mi (0.40 km), and 0.125 mi (0.201 km). The track received positive reception from Mayhew and NASCAR senior director Bob Duvall, with both praising the track's amenities and racing product. Ahead of the 2014 racing season, multiple renovations were completed, including adding 1,000 ft (300 m) of catch-fence in preparation for winged sprint racing and the construction of a RV viewing area outside the third and fourth turns of the track. In October, a motocross track was opened and work began on a 1/3 mi (0.54 km) dirt oval. The dirt oval opened on September 4, 2015, and featured two smaller layouts alongside the 1/3 mi (0.54 km) main layout. In October 2016, Larry Collins, one of the original investors of KCMP, replaced a resigning Lee Baumgarten as the general manager of KCMP. Upon his appointment, Collins announced hopes to expand the facility's weekly local racing events. In 2017, the dirt oval was reconfigured, with the first and second turns made wider; the change was described by Griffith as turning the shape of the track from "essentially a tri-oval" to a true oval. In December 2017, KCMP was listed for sale at $15 million by the track's owners; at the time, the track had a reported value of $40 million. In an analysis article for the Californian, Griffith stated that the facility struggled with getting enough entries for its races, which he stated led to the potential listing of KCMP alongside a decline in local racing popularity and the Kern County economy.

=== Tim and Lisa Huddleston purchase ===
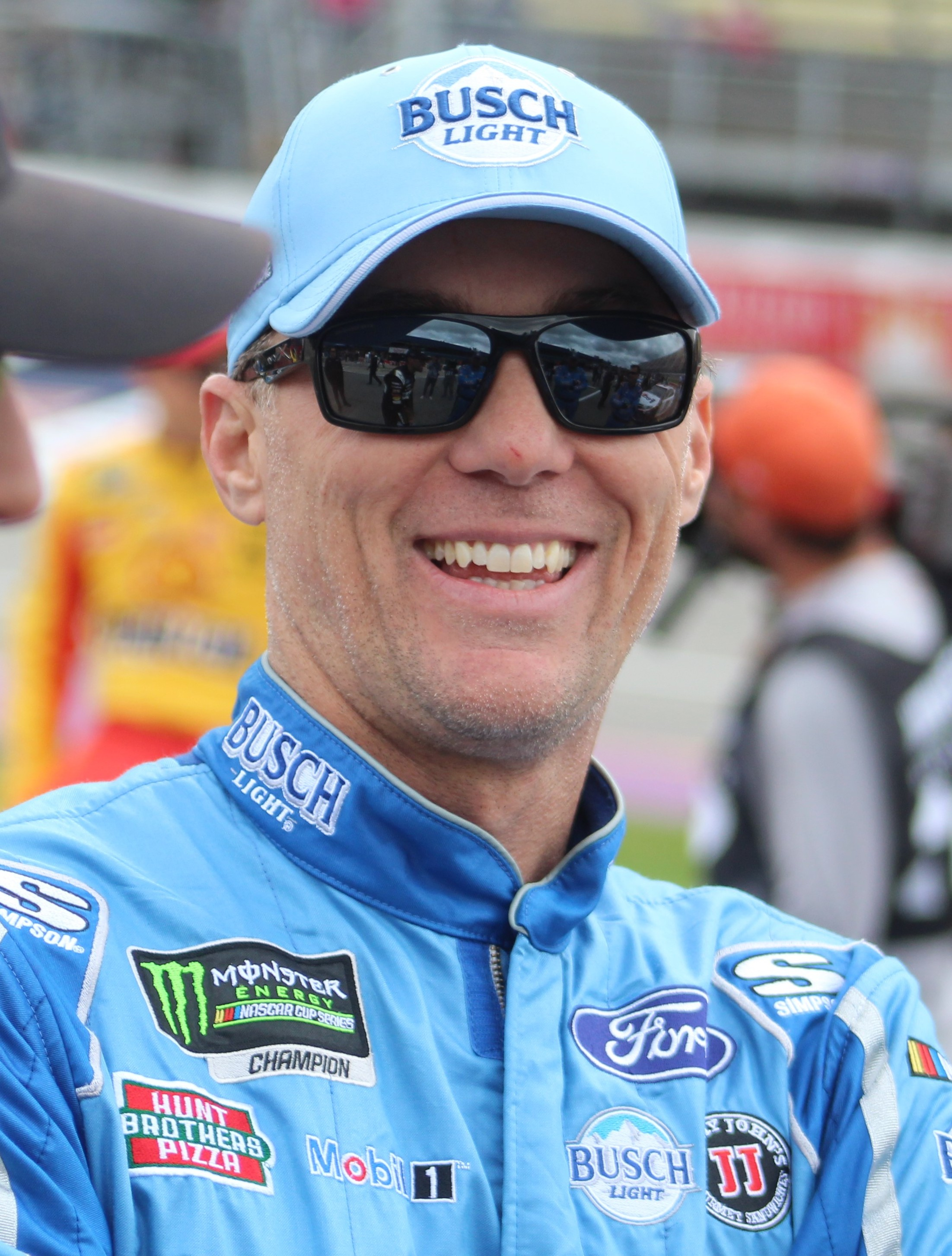
In 2023, Kern Raceway was renamed in honor of racing driver and Bakersfield local Kevin Harvick (pictured in 2019).

In November 2023, the purchase of KCMP by duo Tim Huddleston and Lisa Huddleston was publicly announced. With the purchase, the facility was renamed to "Kevin Harvick's Kern Raceway" in tribute to NASCAR Cup Series driver and Bakersfield local Kevin Harvick, who joined the track's leadership team. In 2025, the operations of the nearby dirt oval Bakersfield Speedway, which closed prior to the 2025 season, moved to the dirt oval at Kern Raceway. As a result, the dirt oval rebranded to the Bakersfield Speedway name and underwent renovations, which included the installation of new crash walls, bleachers, and catch-fence.

== Events ==
=== Racing events ===
Kern Raceway currently hosts local NASCAR-sanctioned events. Since 2013, Kern Raceway has hosted an annual ARCA Menards Series West event (with the exception of 2021). The track also hosts an annual NASCAR Weekly Series season across four divisions, including Limited Pro Late Models, Spec Racer, Crown Vic, and Enduro. Kern Raceway also has hosted numerous non-NASCAR sanctioned series, including the CARS Tour West, the Lucas Oil Modified Series, and the SRL Southwest Tour.

=== Non-racing events ===
From 2021 until 2023, Kern Raceway hosted a charity concert named the Concert for the Causes, which donated to local Kern County non-profit organizations.
