= 2016 Federated Auto Parts 400 =

Race details
- Race 26 of 36 in the 2016 NASCAR Sprint Cup Series
- Date: September 10, 2016
- Location: Richmond International Raceway in Richmond, Virginia
- Course: Permanent racing facility
- Course length: 0.75 miles (1.207 km)
- Distance: 407 laps, 305.25 mi (491.252 km)
- Scheduled distance: 400 laps, 300 mi (482.803 km)
- Average speed: 85.778 mph (138.046 km/h)

Pole position
Driver	Denny Hamlin	Joe Gibbs Racing
- Time: 22.069

Most laps led
Driver	Martin Truex Jr.	Furniture Row Racing
- Laps: 193

Winner
No. 11	Denny Hamlin	Joe Gibbs Racing

Television in the United States
- Network: NBCSN
- Announcers: Rick Allen, Jeff Burton and Steve Letarte
- Nielsen ratings: 1.5/3 (Overnight); 1.6/3 (Final); 2.7 million viewers

Radio in the United States
- Radio: MRN
- Booth announcers: Joe Moore, Jeff Striegle and Rusty Wallace
- Turn announcers: Dave Moody (Backstretch)

The 2016 Federated Auto Parts 400 was a NASCAR Sprint Cup Series stock car race held on September 10, 2016 at Richmond International Raceway in Richmond, Virginia. Contested over 407 laps – extended from 400 laps due to an overtime finish – on the 0.75-mile (1.21-kilometre) D-shaped short track, it was the 26th race of the 2016 NASCAR Sprint Cup Series season, and the final race of the regular season before the playoffs. Joe Gibbs Racing's Denny Hamlin won his second career race at his home track from the pole and his third race of the 2016 season, ahead of Chip Ganassi Racing driver Kyle Larson.

The race had 21 lead changes among 7 different drivers, as well as a new track record with 16 cautions for 89 laps, and a red flag for 20 minutes and 23 seconds.

== Report ==
=== Background ===
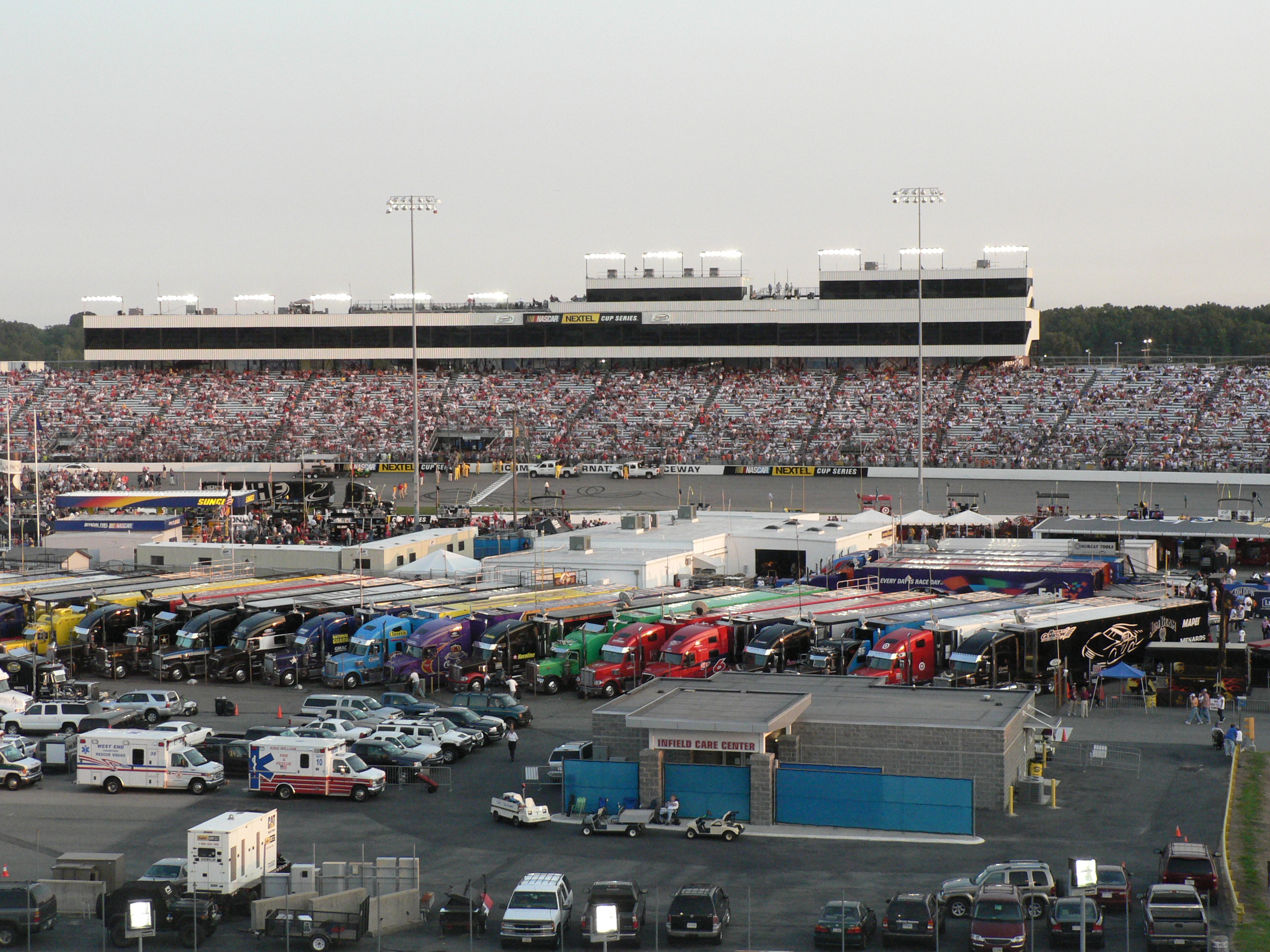
Richmond International Raceway, the track where the race was held.

Richmond International Raceway (RIR) is a 0.75-mile (1.21-kilometre) D-shaped, asphalt race track located just outside Richmond, Virginia in Henrico County.

=== Entry list ===
The preliminary entry list for the race included 41 cars and was released on September 5, 2016 at 12:07 p.m. Eastern time.

No.	Driver	Team	Manufacturer
1	Jamie McMurray	Chip Ganassi Racing	Chevrolet
2	Brad Keselowski	Team Penske	Ford
3	Austin Dillon	Richard Childress Racing	Chevrolet
4	Kevin Harvick	Stewart–Haas Racing	Chevrolet
5	Kasey Kahne	Hendrick Motorsports	Chevrolet
6	Trevor Bayne	Roush Fenway Racing	Ford
7	Regan Smith	Tommy Baldwin Racing	Chevrolet
10	Danica Patrick	Stewart–Haas Racing	Chevrolet
11	Denny Hamlin	Joe Gibbs Racing	Toyota
13	Casey Mears	Germain Racing	Chevrolet
14	Tony Stewart	Stewart–Haas Racing	Chevrolet
15	Clint Bowyer	HScott Motorsports	Chevrolet
16	Greg Biffle	Roush Fenway Racing	Ford
17	Ricky Stenhouse Jr.	Roush Fenway Racing	Ford
18	Kyle Busch	Joe Gibbs Racing	Toyota
19	Carl Edwards	Joe Gibbs Racing	Toyota
20	Matt Kenseth	Joe Gibbs Racing	Toyota
21	Ryan Blaney (R)	Wood Brothers Racing	Ford
22	Joey Logano	Team Penske	Ford
23	David Ragan	BK Racing	Toyota
24	Chase Elliott (R)	Hendrick Motorsports	Chevrolet
27	Paul Menard	Richard Childress Racing	Chevrolet
30	Josh Wise	The Motorsports Group	Chevrolet
31	Ryan Newman	Richard Childress Racing	Chevrolet
32	Jeffrey Earnhardt (R)	Go FAS Racing	Ford
34	Chris Buescher (R)	Front Row Motorsports	Ford
38	Landon Cassill	Front Row Motorsports	Ford
41	Kurt Busch	Stewart–Haas Racing	Chevrolet
42	Kyle Larson	Chip Ganassi Racing	Chevrolet
43	Aric Almirola	Richard Petty Motorsports	Ford
44	Brian Scott (R)	Richard Petty Motorsports	Ford
46	Michael Annett	HScott Motorsports	Chevrolet
47	A. J. Allmendinger	JTG Daugherty Racing	Chevrolet
48	Jimmie Johnson	Hendrick Motorsports	Chevrolet
55	Reed Sorenson	Premium Motorsports	Chevrolet
78	Martin Truex Jr.	Furniture Row Racing	Toyota
83	Dylan Lupton (i)	BK Racing	Toyota
88	Jeff Gordon	Hendrick Motorsports	Chevrolet
93	Matt DiBenedetto	BK Racing	Toyota
95	Michael McDowell	Circle Sport – Leavine Family Racing	Chevrolet
98	Cole Whitt	Premium Motorsports	Chevrolet
Official entry list

== Practice ==
=== First practice ===
Kyle Busch was the fastest in the first practice session with a time of 22.318 and a speed of 120.979 mph (194.697 km/h).

Pos	No.	Driver	Team	Manufacturer	Time	Speed
1	18	Kyle Busch	Joe Gibbs Racing	Toyota	22.318	120.979
2	78	Martin Truex Jr.	Furniture Row Racing	Toyota	22.379	120.649
3	11	Denny Hamlin	Joe Gibbs Racing	Toyota	22.397	120.552
Official first practice results

=== Final practice ===
Casey Mears was the fastest in the final practice session with a time of 22.396 and a speed of 120.557 mph (194.018 km/h).

Pos	No.	Driver	Team	Manufacturer	Time	Speed
1	13	Casey Mears	Germain Racing	Chevrolet	22.396	120.557
2	42	Kyle Larson	Chip Ganassi Racing	Chevrolet	22.482	120.096
3	78	Martin Truex Jr.	Furniture Row Racing	Toyota	22.536	119.808
Official final practice results

== Qualifying ==
Denny Hamlin scored the pole for the race with a time of 22.069 and a speed of 122.344 mph (196.894 km/h). Asked why it took so long in the season to get a pole, Hamlin said he had "no idea. We were second and third so many times it was crazy. We were actually looking at the rainouts and were like, 'We're going to start seventh because of the rainouts. It hurts our average.'" He also added that Richmond was his "hometown (being from nearby Chesterfield County, Virginia), so I'd probably be a little more aggressive than I would at any other racetrack, but ultimately this race isn't going to make or break a championship run for us, but it surely would do a whole lot for momentum and feel-good going into the Chase if we could win."

=== Qualifying results ===
Pos	No.	Driver	Team	Manufacturer	R1	R2	R3
1	11	Denny Hamlin	Joe Gibbs Racing	Toyota	21.905	21.970	22.069
2	42	Kyle Larson	Chip Ganassi Racing	Chevrolet	21.845	21.979	22.079
3	20	Matt Kenseth	Joe Gibbs Racing	Toyota	21.938	22.011	22.087
4	1	Jamie McMurray	Chip Ganassi Racing	Chevrolet	21.865	21.999	22.097
5	41	Kurt Busch	Stewart–Haas Racing	Chevrolet	21.808	21.891	22.105
6	78	Martin Truex Jr.	Furniture Row Racing	Toyota	21.874	21.958	22.123
7	5	Kasey Kahne	Hendrick Motorsports	Chevrolet	21.816	22.039	22.123
8	3	Austin Dillon	Richard Childress Racing	Chevrolet	21.846	22.056	22.197
9	18	Kyle Busch	Joe Gibbs Racing	Toyota	21.844	21.996	22.230
10	48	Jimmie Johnson	Hendrick Motorsports	Chevrolet	22.011	22.050	22.323
11	88	Jeff Gordon	Hendrick Motorsports	Chevrolet	21.974	22.006	22.346
12	22	Joey Logano	Team Penske	Ford	21.983	22.080	22.392
13	19	Carl Edwards	Joe Gibbs Racing	Toyota	21.939	22.082	
14	14	Tony Stewart	Stewart–Haas Racing	Chevrolet	21.990	22.086	
15	31	Ryan Newman	Richard Childress Racing	Chevrolet	21.976	22.123	
16	47	A. J. Allmendinger	JTG Daugherty Racing	Chevrolet	22.066	22.128	
17	2	Brad Keselowski	Team Penske	Ford	21.865	22.145	
18	6	Trevor Bayne	Roush Fenway Racing	Ford	22.011	22.173	
19	4	Kevin Harvick	Stewart–Haas Racing	Chevrolet	22.065	22.212	
20	21	Ryan Blaney (R)	Wood Brothers Racing	Ford	21.859	22.217	
21	23	David Ragan	BK Racing	Toyota	22.012	22.257	
22	17	Ricky Stenhouse Jr.	Roush Fenway Racing	Ford	22.066	22.378	
23	43	Aric Almirola	Richard Petty Motorsports	Ford	22.068	22.425	
24	7	Regan Smith	Tommy Baldwin Racing	Chevrolet	22.049	22.440	
25	93	Matt DiBenedetto	BK Racing	Toyota	22.077		
26	13	Casey Mears	Germin Racing	Chevrolet	22.078		
27	95	Michael McDowell	Circle Sport – Leavine Family Racing	Chevrolet	22.079		
28	16	Greg Biffle	Roush Fenway Racing	Ford	22.083		
29	10	Danica Patrick	Stewart–Haas Racing	Chevrolet	22.102		
30	27	Paul Menard	Richard Childress Racing	Chevrolet	22.117		
31	34	Chris Buescher (R)	Front Row Motorsports	Ford	22.139		
32	38	Landon Cassill	Front Row Motorsports	Ford	22.143		
33	15	Clint Bowyer	HScott Motorsports	Chevrolet	22.171		
34	24	Chase Elliott (R)	Hendrick Motorsports	Chevrolet	22.172		
35	44	Brian Scott (R)	Richard Petty Motorsports	Ford	22.215		
36	30	Josh Wise	The Motorsports Group	Chevrolet	22.268		
37	46	Michael Annett	HScott Motorsports	Chevrolet	22.269		
38	55	Reed Sorenson	Premium Motorsports	Chevrolet	22.328		
39	83	Dylan Lupton (i)	BK Racing	Toyota	22.461		
40	32	Jeffrey Earnhardt (R)	Go FAS Racing	Ford	22.466		
Failed to qualify
41	98	Cole Whitt	Premium Motorsports	Chevrolet	22.519		
Official qualifying results

== Race ==
=== First half ===
Under mostly clear evening Virginia skies, Denny Hamlin led the field to the green flag at 7:47. Ryan Blaney brought out the first caution of the race on lap 10 after suffering a tire blowout and slamming the wall in turn 1.

The race restarted on lap 16. The field settled into place and rode around the track. Martin Truex Jr. took the lead from Hamlin on lap 52. The second caution of the race flew on lap 85 for A. J. Allmendinger spinning out in turn 4. Kurt Busch exited pit road with the race lead after missing his pit stall. He came back in and the lead went to Hamlin. During the caution, Greg Biffle got into and turned Tony Stewart on pit road. Jimmie Johnson and Kasey Kahne were sent to the tail end of the field for speeding on pit road.

The race restarted on lap 92. The third caution of the race flew on lap 96 for Chase Elliott suffering a tire blowout and slamming the wall on the frontstretch.

The race restarted on lap 100. For the next 102 laps, the race ran green. Truex took back the race lead on the restart and held it until Johnson suffered a tire blowout, slammed the turn 1 wall and brought out the fourth caution of the race on lap 202.

=== Second half ===
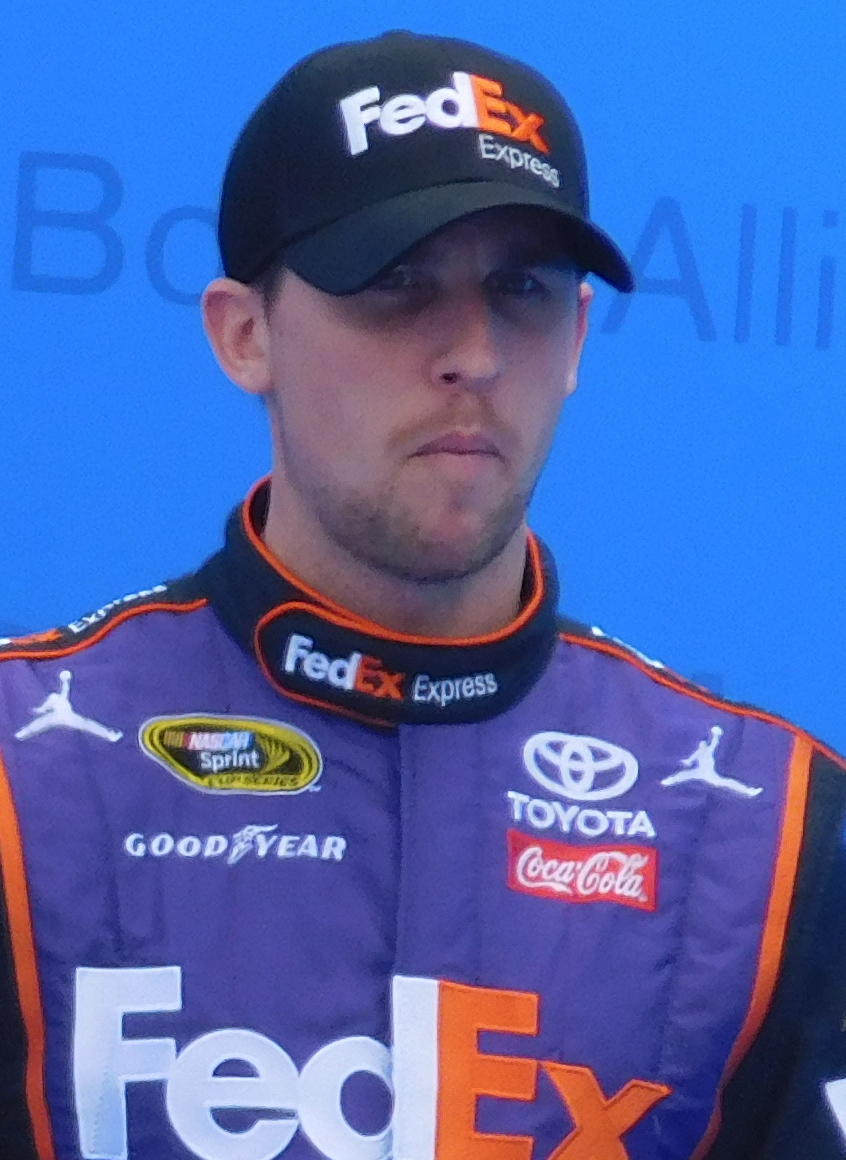
Denny Hamlin won the race from the pole position.

The race restarted on lap 212. Debris on the frontstretch brought out the fifth caution of the race on lap 223. Brad Keselowski was sent to the tail end of the field for speeding.

The race restarted on lap 228. Kurt Busch held the lead for two laps before Truex took it back. Matt Kenseth took the lead from Truex on lap 246 as the sixth caution of the race flew for David Ragan suffering a tire blowout and slamming the wall in turn 1. Regan Smith opted not to pit when the lead lap cars did and assumed the lead, but came down two laps later and handed the lead to Hamlin. Five drivers were sent to the rear for various penalties during the caution: Kevin Harvick and Ragan for speeding, Aric Almirola and Kenseth for a pit box violation, and Brian Scott for too many crew members over the wall.

The race restarted on lap 251. The seventh caution of the race flew on lap 266 for Paul Menard rear-ending the wall in turn 2. He went on to finish 40th. Kyle Larson exited pit road with the race lead. Danica Patrick (commitment line violation) and Truex (speeding) were sent to the tail end of the field for pit road infractions.

The race restarted on lap 272. Hamlin powered by Larson to retake the lead on lap 273. The eighth caution of the race flew on lap 280 for a single-car wreck involving Casey Mears in turn 3.

The race restarted on lap 285. The ninth caution of the race flew on lap 292 after Michael Annett suffered a tire blowout and slammed the wall in turn 2. Larson exited pit road with the race lead.

The race restarted with 104 laps to go. Truex worked his way back to the lead with 96 laps to go. The 10th caution of the race flew with 78 laps to go for a single-car wreck in turn 2 involving Carl Edwards. Hamlin exited pit road with the race lead. Ryan Newman (speeding) and Ricky Stenhouse Jr. (pit box violation) were sent to the tail end of the field for pit road infractions.

The race restarted with 73 laps to go. The 11th caution of the race flew with 71 laps to go for Allmendinger slamming the wall in turn 1.

The race restarted with 67 laps to go. The 12th caution of the race flew with 63 laps to go for Kenseth slamming the wall in turn 2. This came after contact with Keselowski on the previous restart. Kenseth said after the race that he was sure Keselowski would "send a Tweet out or go on a TV show and explain how it wasn't his fault. But he knows better than that. He knows his angle was bad and he just drove way up in the corner because he made a mistake and he was trying to make up for it and had no respect for anybody on the outside lane. Unfortunately, we had a wrecked car because of it." Keselowski said he "just missed a shift and ruined Matt's day. ... I made a mistake, and it was kind of crappy for everyone. Hopefully, he'll accept the apology. ... That's not what anybody wants to see, including myself."

The race restarted with 56 laps to go. The 13th caution of the race flew with 53 laps to go for Allmendinger wrecking on the fronstretch.

The race restarted with 49 laps to go. The 14th caution of the race flew with 45 laps to go for Matt DiBenedetto suffering a tire blowout and slamming the wall in turn 3.

The race restarted with 38 laps to go. The 15th caution of the race flew with 36 laps to go for an eight-car wreck in turn 3. It started when Stewart came down across the nose of Newman's car and sent both of them into the wall. As they continued traveling, more cars were collected as Ragan slammed into the back of Newman's car, Scott slammed into Ragan's car and Dylan Lupton got into Newman and his car ended up off the ground. Newman said afterwards that Stewart "has got issues. We all know he's got issues. He proved it again tonight. I was clearly inside of him getting into Turn 1, he cut across my nose, I was on the brakes, on the apron and I hit him coming off of Turn 2, but only because I got loose, I was on the apron. The next thing I know he is driving across my nose on the back straightaway because he's Tony Stewart and he thinks he owns everything. It's unfortunate, but shouldn't expect anything less from him." Stewart responded to Newman's comments saying his former teammate "had to press the issue tonight and put himself in a couple of bad spots. There's 39 other guys you can put yourself in bad spots with. Don't put yourself in a bad spot with me and don't start shoving me around the racetrack because he knows from experience I don't put up with it." "It's an important race," Stewart added. "He was in a pressure situation coming into here and I had nothing to do with the first 25 races to put him in a pressure situation. You expect to get run into once or twice but the third time's the charm and that's when I had enough of it. I wrecked myself doing it. So it wasn't like I didn't wreck myself doing it. I'm not really sure that I'm going to lose a lot of sleep over his opinion."

The red flag then came out to ensue to facilitate cleanup around the track, After 20 minutes and 23 seconds, the red flag was lifted and the field continued under caution.

The race restarted with 31 laps to go. Hamlin was pulling away from the field and had the race all but locked up until Smith suffered a tire blowout, slammed the wall in turn 3 and brought out the 16th caution of the race with two laps to go.

=== Overtime ===
The race restarted with two laps to go, six laps past the 400 lap advertised distance, and Hamlin scored the victory while Kurt Busch spun out coming to the overtime line.

== Post-race ==
=== Driver comments ===
Hamlin said in victory lane that winning the race "feels great. I'll tell you, our cars were really running well. Wheels and the whole group just gave me a great car. Really got it tuned in there the last half of the race. Just good restarts, finally everything just kind of worked well for us all day. I didn't think staying out was the right thing to do, but great call there, and actually, I got this from one of our Toyota guests on his birthday day today. He gave me this. He said it helped him get through tough times, so kept that in the car, and thank Eli for that."

== Race results ==
Pos	No.	Driver	Team	Manufacturer	Laps	Points
1	11	Denny Hamlin	Joe Gibbs Racing	Toyota	407	44
2	42	Kyle Larson	Chip Ganassi Racing	Chevrolet	407	40
3	78	Martin Truex Jr.	Furniture Row Racing	Toyota	407	40
4	2	Brad Keselowski	Team Penske	Ford	407	37
5	4	Kevin Harvick	Stewart–Haas Racing	Chevrolet	407	36
6	5	Kasey Kahne	Hendrick Motorsports	Chevrolet	407	35
7	1	Jamie McMurray	Chip Ganassi Racing	Chevrolet	407	34
8	41	Kurt Busch	Stewart–Haas Racing	Chevrolet	407	34
9	18	Kyle Busch	Joe Gibbs Racing	Toyota	407	32
10	22	Joey Logano	Team Penske	Ford	407	31
11	48	Jimmie Johnson	Hendrick Motorsports	Chevrolet	407	30
12	95	Michael McDowell	Circle Sport – Leavine Family Racing	Chevrolet	407	29
13	3	Austin Dillon	Richard Childress Racing	Chevrolet	407	28
14	6	Trevor Bayne	Roush Fenway Racing	Ford	407	27
15	10	Danica Patrick	Stewart–Haas Racing	Chevrolet	407	26
16	88	Jeff Gordon	Hendrick Motorsports	Chevrolet	407	25
17	43	Aric Almirola	Richard Petty Motorsports	Ford	407	24
18	17	Ricky Stenhouse Jr.	Roush Fenway Racing	Ford	407	23
19	24	Chase Elliott (R)	Hendrick Motorsports	Chevrolet	407	22
20	47	A. J. Allmendinger	JTG Daugherty Racing	Chevrolet	407	21
21	13	Casey Mears	Germin Racing	Chevrolet	407	20
22	15	Clint Bowyer	HScott Motorsports	Chevrolet	407	19
23	16	Greg Biffle	Roush Fenway Racing	Ford	407	18
24	34	Chris Buescher (R)	Front Row Motorsports	Ford	407	17
25	83	Dylan Lupton (i)	BK Racing	Toyota	406	0
26	55	Reed Sorenson	Premium Motorsports	Chevrolet	404	15
27	32	Jeffrey Earnhardt (R)	Go FAS Racing	Ford	403	15
28	31	Ryan Newman	Richard Childress Racing	Chevrolet	402	13
29	7	Regan Smith	Tommy Baldwin Racing	Chevrolet	397	13
30	30	Josh Wise	The Motorsports Group	Chevrolet	396	11
31	46	Michael Annett	HScott Motorsports	Chevrolet	390	10
32	19	Carl Edwards	Joe Gibbs Racing	Toyota	366	9
33	14	Tony Stewart	Stewart–Haas Racing	Chevrolet	363	8
34	23	David Ragan	BK Racing	Toyota	362	7
35	44	Brian Scott (R)	Richard Petty Motorsports	Ford	362	6
36	38	Landon Cassill	Front Row Motorsports	Ford	358	5
37	93	Matt DiBenedetto	BK Racing	Toyota	352	4
38	20	Matt Kenseth	Joe Gibbs Racing	Toyota	335	4
39	21	Ryan Blaney (R)	Wood Brothers Racing	Ford	279	2
40	27	Paul Menard	Richard Childress Racing	Chevrolet	264	1
Official race results

=== Race summary ===
- Lead changes: 21 among different drivers
- Cautions/Laps: 16 for 89 laps
- Red flags: 1 for 20 minutes and 23 seconds
- Time of race: 3 hours, 31 minutes and 33 seconds
- Average speed: 85.778 miles per hour (138.046 km/h)

== Media ==
=== Television ===
NBC Sports covered the race on the television side. Rick Allen, Jeff Burton and Steve Letarte had the call in the booth for the race. Dave Burns, Mike Massaro, Marty Snider and Kelli Stavast reported from pit lane during the race.

NBCSN
Booth announcers	Pit reporters
Lap-by-lap: Rick Allen; Color-commentator: Jeff Burton; Color-commentator: Steve Letarte	Dave Burns; Mike Massaro; Marty Snider; Kelli Stavast

=== Radio ===
The Motor Racing Network had the radio call for the race, which was simulcast on Sirius XM NASCAR Radio.

MRN
Booth announcers	Turn announcers	Pit reporters
Lead announcer: Joe Moore; Announcer: Jeff Striegle; Announcer: Rusty Wallace	Backstretch: Dave Moody	Alex Hayden; Winston Kelley; Steve Post

== Standings after the race ==
Drivers' Championship standings after Chase reset

	Pos	Manufacturer	Points
6	1	Kyle Busch	2,012
	2	Brad Keselowski	2,012
2	3	Denny Hamlin	2,009 (–3)
3	4	Kevin Harvick	2,006 (–6)
1	5	Carl Edwards	2,006 (–6)
2	6	Martin Truex Jr.	2,006 (–6)
2	7	Matt Kenseth	2,006 (–6)
3	8	Jimmie Johnson	2,006 (–6)
6	9	Joey Logano	2,003 (–9)
5	10	Kyle Larson	2,003 (–9)
16	11	Tony Stewart	2,003 (–9)
6	12	Kurt Busch	2,003 (–9)
17	13	Chris Buescher	2,003 (–9)
4	14	Chase Elliott	2,000 (–12)
3	15	Austin Dillon	2,000 (–12)
3	16	Jamie McMurray	2,000 (–12)
Official driver's standings

Manufacturers' Championship standings

Pos	Manufacturer	Points
1	Toyota	1,072
2	Chevrolet	1,045 (–27)
3	Ford	994 (–78)
Official manufacturers' standings

- Note: Only the first sixteen positions are included for the driver standings.

Previous race: 2016 Bojangles' Southern 500	Sprint Cup Series; 2016 season	Next race: 2016 Teenage Mutant Ninja Turtles 400
