= 2017 Irish Hills 250 =

13th race of the 2017 NASCAR Xfinity Series

Race details
- Race 13 of 33 in the 2017 NASCAR Xfinity Series
- Date: June 17, 2017
- Official name: 26th Annual Irish Hills 250
- Location: Brooklyn, Michigan, Michigan International Speedway
- Course: Permanent racing facility
- Course length: 2 miles (3.2 km)
- Distance: 125 laps, 250 mi (402.336 km)
- Scheduled distance: 125 laps, 250 mi (402.336 km)
- Average speed: 124.671 miles per hour (200.639 km/h)

Pole position
Driver	Kyle Busch	Joe Gibbs Racing
- Time: 37.197

Most laps led
Driver	Brad Keselowski	Team Penske
- Laps: 54

Winner
No. 20	Denny Hamlin	Joe Gibbs Racing

Television in the United States
- Network: Fox Sports 1
- Announcers: Adam Alexander, Michael Waltrip, Austin Dillon

Radio in the United States
- Radio: Motor Racing Network

The 2017 Irish Hills 250 was the 13th stock car race of the 2017 NASCAR Xfinity Series season and the 26th iteration of the event. The race was held on Saturday, June 17, 2017, in Brooklyn, Michigan at Michigan International Speedway, a two-mile (3.2 km) permanent moderate-banked D-shaped speedway. The race took the scheduled 125 laps to complete. At race's end, Denny Hamlin, driving for Joe Gibbs Racing, would win in a close finish on the final restart with two to go. The win was Hamlin's 16th career NASCAR Xfinity Series win and his first win of the season. To fill out the podium, William Byron and Elliott Sadler, both driving for JR Motorsports, would finish second and third, respectively.

== Entry list ==
- (R) denotes rookie driver.
- (i) denotes driver who is ineligible for series driver points.

#	Driver	Team	Make
00	Cole Custer (R)	Stewart–Haas Racing	Ford
0	Garrett Smithley	JD Motorsports	Chevrolet
1	Elliott Sadler	JR Motorsports	Chevrolet
01	Harrison Rhodes	JD Motorsports	Chevrolet
2	Paul Menard (i)	Richard Childress Racing	Chevrolet
3	Ty Dillon (i)	Richard Childress Racing	Chevrolet
4	Ross Chastain	JD Motorsports	Chevrolet
5	Michael Annett	JR Motorsports	Chevrolet
7	Justin Allgaier	JR Motorsports	Chevrolet
07	Korbin Forrister (i)	SS-Green Light Racing	Chevrolet
8	B. J. McLeod	B. J. McLeod Motorsports	Chevrolet
9	William Byron (R)	JR Motorsports	Chevrolet
11	Blake Koch	Kaulig Racing	Chevrolet
13	Timmy Hill	MBM Motorsports	Toyota
14	J. J. Yeley	TriStar Motorsports	Toyota
16	Ryan Reed	Roush Fenway Racing	Ford
18	Kyle Busch (i)	Joe Gibbs Racing	Toyota
19	Matt Tifft (R)	Joe Gibbs Racing	Toyota
20	Denny Hamlin (i)	Joe Gibbs Racing	Toyota
21	Daniel Hemric (R)	Richard Childress Racing	Chevrolet
22	Brad Keselowski (i)	Team Penske	Ford
23	Spencer Gallagher (R)	GMS Racing	Chevrolet
24	Dylan Lupton	JGL Racing	Toyota
28	Dakoda Armstrong	JGL Racing	Toyota
33	Brandon Jones	Richard Childress Racing	Chevrolet
39	Ryan Sieg	RSS Racing	Chevrolet
40	Josh Bilicki	MBM Motorsports	Chevrolet
42	Tyler Reddick	Chip Ganassi Racing	Chevrolet
48	Brennan Poole	Chip Ganassi Racing	Chevrolet
51	Jeremy Clements	Jeremy Clements Racing	Chevrolet
52	Joey Gase	Jimmy Means Racing	Chevrolet
62	Brendan Gaughan	Richard Childress Racing	Chevrolet
74	Mike Harmon	Mike Harmon Racing	Dodge
78	Tommy Joe Martins	B. J. McLeod Motorsports	Chevrolet
89	Morgan Shepherd	Shepherd Racing Ventures	Chevrolet
90	Brandon Brown	Brandonbilt Motorsports	Chevrolet
92	Josh Williams	King Autosport	Chevrolet
93	Jeff Green	RSS Racing	Chevrolet
96	Ben Kennedy (R)	GMS Racing	Chevrolet
99	David Starr	B. J. McLeod Motorsports with SS-Green Light Racing	Chevrolet
Official entry list

== Practice ==
=== First practice ===
The first practice session was held on Friday, July 18, at 12:30 PM EST. The session would last for 55 minutes. Spencer Gallagher of GMS Racing would set the fastest time in the session, with a lap of 37.834 and an average speed of 190.305 mph (306.266 km/h).

Pos	#	Driver	Team	Make	Time	Speed
1	23	Spencer Gallagher (R)	GMS Racing	Chevrolet	37.834	190.305
2	16	Ryan Reed	Roush Fenway Racing	Ford	37.871	190.119
3	22	Brad Keselowski (i)	Team Penske	Ford	37.953	189.708
Full first practice results

=== Final practice ===
The final practice session was held on Friday, July 18, at 3:00 PM EST. The session would last for 55 minutes. Brad Keselowski of Team Penske would set the fastest time in the session, with a lap of 37.277 and an average speed of 193.149 mph (310.843 km/h).

Pos	#	Driver	Team	Make	Time	Speed
1	22	Brad Keselowski (i)	Team Penske	Ford	37.277	193.149
2	1	Elliott Sadler	JR Motorsports	Chevrolet	37.289	193.086
3	33	Brandon Jones	Richard Childress Racing	Chevrolet	37.675	191.108
Full final practice results

== Qualifying ==
Qualifying was held on Saturday, June 17, at 10:00 AM EST. Since Michigan International Speedway is at least 2 miles (3.2 km), the qualifying system was a single car, single lap, two round system where in the first round, everyone would set a time to determine positions 13–40. Then, the fastest 12 qualifiers would move on to the second round to determine positions 1–12.

Kyle Busch of Joe Gibbs Racing would win the pole, setting a time of 37.197 and an average speed of 193.564 miles per hour (311.511 km/h) in the second round.

No drivers would fail to qualify.

=== Full qualifying results ===
Pos	#	Driver	Team	Make	Time (R1)	Speed (R1)	Time (R2)	Speed (R2)
1	18	Kyle Busch (i)	Joe Gibbs Racing	Toyota	37.409	192.467	37.197	193.564
2	22	Brad Keselowski (i)	Team Penske	Ford	37.234	193.372	37.222	193.434
3	1	Elliott Sadler	JR Motorsports	Chevrolet	37.498	192.010	37.251	193.283
4	9	William Byron (R)	JR Motorsports	Chevrolet	37.598	191.500	37.273	193.169
5	20	Denny Hamlin (i)	Joe Gibbs Racing	Toyota	37.628	191.347	37.374	192.647
6	42	Tyler Reddick	Chip Ganassi Racing	Chevrolet	37.432	192.349	37.504	191.980
7	00	Cole Custer (R)	Stewart–Haas Racing	Ford	37.764	190.658	37.670	191.134
8	23	Spencer Gallagher (R)	GMS Racing	Chevrolet	37.687	191.047	37.788	190.537
9	5	Michael Annett	JR Motorsports	Chevrolet	37.706	190.951	37.812	190.416
10	2	Paul Menard (i)	Richard Childress Racing	Chevrolet	37.717	190.895	37.845	190.250
11	33	Brandon Jones	Richard Childress Racing	Chevrolet	37.788	190.537	38.266	188.157
12	96	Ben Kennedy (R)	GMS Racing	Chevrolet	37.736	190.799	38.470	187.159
Eliminated in Round 1
13	11	Blake Koch	Kaulig Racing	Chevrolet	37.802	190.466	-	-
14	19	Matt Tifft (R)	Joe Gibbs Racing	Toyota	37.880	190.074	-	-
15	48	Brennan Poole	Chip Ganassi Racing	Chevrolet	37.889	190.029	-	-
16	21	Daniel Hemric (R)	Richard Childress Racing	Chevrolet	37.908	189.934	-	-
17	3	Ty Dillon (i)	Richard Childress Racing	Chevrolet	37.929	189.828	-	-
18	39	Ryan Sieg	RSS Racing	Chevrolet	37.983	189.558	-	-
19	51	Jeremy Clements	Jeremy Clements Racing	Chevrolet	38.030	189.324	-	-
20	16	Ryan Reed	Roush Fenway Racing	Ford	38.043	189.260	-	-
21	14	J. J. Yeley	TriStar Motorsports	Toyota	38.065	189.150		
22	7	Justin Allgaier	JR Motorsports	Chevrolet	38.088	189.036	-	-
23	62	Brendan Gaughan	Richard Childress Racing	Chevrolet	38.123	188.862	-	-
24	4	Ross Chastain	JD Motorsports	Chevrolet	38.134	188.808	-	-
25	93	Jeff Green	RSS Racing	Chevrolet	38.204	188.462	-	-
26	0	Garrett Smithley	JD Motorsports	Chevrolet	38.989	184.667	-	-
27	01	Harrison Rhodes	JD Motorsports	Chevrolet	39.020	184.521	-	-
28	28	Dakoda Armstrong	JGL Racing	Toyota	39.036	184.445	-	-
29	8	B. J. McLeod	B. J. McLeod Motorsports	Chevrolet	39.039	184.431	-	-
30	24	Dylan Lupton	JGL Racing	Toyota	39.248	183.449	-	-
31	90	Brandon Brown	Brandonbilt Motorsports	Chevrolet	39.524	182.168	-	-
32	40	Josh Bilicki	MBM Motorsports	Chevrolet	39.554	182.030		
33	07	Korbin Forrister (i)	SS-Green Light Racing	Chevrolet	39.564	181.984	-	-
Qualified by owner's points
34	78	Tommy Joe Martins	B. J. McLeod Motorsports	Chevrolet	39.692	181.397	-	-
35	52	Joey Gase	Jimmy Means Racing	Chevrolet	40.228	178.980	-	-
36	92	Josh Williams	King Autosport	Chevrolet	40.231	178.966	-	-
37	89	Morgan Shepherd	Shepherd Racing Ventures	Chevrolet	40.268	178.802	-	-
38	99	David Starr	BJMM with SS-Green Light Racing	Chevrolet	40.518	177.699	-	-
39	13	Timmy Hill	MBM Motorsports	Toyota	40.604	177.322	-	-
40	74	Mike Harmon	Mike Harmon Racing	Dodge	40.788	176.523	-	-
Official qualifying results
Official starting lineup

== Race results ==
Stage 1 Laps: 30

Pos	#	Driver	Team	Make	Pts
1	22	Brad Keselowski (i)	Team Penske	Ford	0
2	20	Denny Hamlin (i)	Joe Gibbs Racing	Toyota	0
3	1	Elliott Sadler	JR Motorsports	Chevrolet	8
4	2	Paul Menard (i)	Richard Childress Racing	Chevrolet	0
5	9	William Byron (R)	JR Motorsports	Chevrolet	6
6	42	Tyler Reddick	Chip Ganassi Racing	Chevrolet	5
7	23	Spencer Gallagher (R)	GMS Racing	Chevrolet	4
8	3	Ty Dillon (i)	Richard Childress Racing	Chevrolet	0
9	00	Cole Custer (R)	Stewart–Haas Racing	Ford	2
10	7	Justin Allgaier	JR Motorsports	Chevrolet	1

Stage 2 Laps: 30

Pos	#	Driver	Team	Make	Pts
1	1	Elliott Sadler	JR Motorsports	Chevrolet	10
2	48	Brennan Poole	Chip Ganassi Racing	Chevrolet	9
3	7	Justin Allgaier	JR Motorsports	Chevrolet	8
4	62	Brendan Gaughan	Richard Childress Racing	Chevrolet	7
5	11	Blake Koch	Kaulig Racing	Chevrolet	6
6	33	Brandon Jones	Richard Childress Racing	Chevrolet	5
7	4	Ross Chastain	JD Motorsports	Chevrolet	4
8	01	Harrison Rhodes	JD Motorsports	Chevrolet	3
9	92	Josh Williams	King Autosport	Chevrolet	2
10	20	Denny Hamlin (i)	Joe Gibbs Racing	Toyota	0

Stage 3 Laps: 65

Pos	#	Driver	Team	Make	Laps	Led	Status	Pts
1	20	Denny Hamlin (i)	Joe Gibbs Racing	Toyota	125	34	running	0
2	9	William Byron (R)	JR Motorsports	Chevrolet	125	8	running	41
3	1	Elliott Sadler	JR Motorsports	Chevrolet	125	14	running	52
4	22	Brad Keselowski (i)	Team Penske	Ford	125	54	running	0
5	18	Kyle Busch (i)	Joe Gibbs Racing	Toyota	125	0	running	0
6	3	Ty Dillon (i)	Richard Childress Racing	Chevrolet	125	0	running	0
7	2	Paul Menard (i)	Richard Childress Racing	Chevrolet	125	0	running	0
8	16	Ryan Reed	Roush Fenway Racing	Ford	125	0	running	29
9	33	Brandon Jones	Richard Childress Racing	Chevrolet	125	0	running	33
10	00	Cole Custer (R)	Stewart–Haas Racing	Ford	125	15	running	29
11	48	Brennan Poole	Chip Ganassi Racing	Chevrolet	125	0	running	35
12	21	Daniel Hemric (R)	Richard Childress Racing	Chevrolet	125	0	running	25
13	42	Tyler Reddick	Chip Ganassi Racing	Chevrolet	125	0	running	29
14	62	Brendan Gaughan	Richard Childress Racing	Chevrolet	125	0	running	30
15	39	Ryan Sieg	RSS Racing	Chevrolet	125	0	running	22
16	7	Justin Allgaier	JR Motorsports	Chevrolet	125	0	running	30
17	11	Blake Koch	Kaulig Racing	Chevrolet	125	0	running	26
18	23	Spencer Gallagher (R)	GMS Racing	Chevrolet	125	0	running	23
19	4	Ross Chastain	JD Motorsports	Chevrolet	125	0	running	22
20	28	Dakoda Armstrong	JGL Racing	Toyota	125	0	running	17
21	99	David Starr	BJMM with SS-Green Light Racing	Chevrolet	125	0	running	16
22	01	Harrison Rhodes	JD Motorsports	Chevrolet	125	0	running	18
23	51	Jeremy Clements	Jeremy Clements Racing	Chevrolet	125	0	running	14
24	24	Dylan Lupton	JGL Racing	Toyota	125	0	running	13
25	52	Joey Gase	Jimmy Means Racing	Chevrolet	124	0	running	12
26	19	Matt Tifft (R)	Joe Gibbs Racing	Toyota	124	0	running	11
27	40	Josh Bilicki	MBM Motorsports	Chevrolet	123	0	running	10
28	78	Tommy Joe Martins	B. J. McLeod Motorsports	Chevrolet	122	0	running	9
29	0	Garrett Smithley	JD Motorsports	Chevrolet	122	0	running	8
30	8	B. J. McLeod	B. J. McLeod Motorsports	Chevrolet	122	0	running	7
31	07	Korbin Forrister (i)	SS-Green Light Racing	Chevrolet	122	0	running	0
32	74	Mike Harmon	Mike Harmon Racing	Dodge	120	0	running	5
33	90	Brandon Brown	Brandonbilt Motorsports	Chevrolet	118	0	running	4
34	92	Josh Williams	King Autosport	Chevrolet	66	0	electrical	5
35	93	Jeff Green	RSS Racing	Chevrolet	44	0	vibration	2
36	96	Ben Kennedy (R)	GMS Racing	Chevrolet	41	0	crash	1
37	5	Michael Annett	JR Motorsports	Chevrolet	38	0	crash	1
38	14	J. J. Yeley	TriStar Motorsports	Toyota	37	0	crash	1
39	13	Timmy Hill	MBM Motorsports	Toyota	20	0	steering	1
40	89	Morgan Shepherd	Shepherd Racing Ventures	Chevrolet	19	0	suspension	1
Official race results

== Standings after the race ==
Drivers' Championship standings

Pos	Driver	Points
1	Elliott Sadler	460
2	Justin Allgaier	439 (–21)
3	William Byron	388 (–72)
4	Daniel Hemric	339 (–121)
5	Brennan Poole	326 (–134)
6	Ryan Reed	325 (–135)
7	Bubba Wallace	321 (–139)
8	Cole Custer	309 (–151)
9	Matt Tifft	295 (–165)
10	Michael Annett	273 (–187)
11	Blake Koch	263 (–197)
12	Dakoda Armstrong	243 (–217)
Official driver's standings

- Note: Only the first 12 positions are included for the driver standings.

Previous race: 2017 Pocono Green 250	NASCAR Xfinity Series; 2017 season	Next race: 2017 American Ethanol E15 250
