= Dylan Lupton =

American racing driver (born 1993)

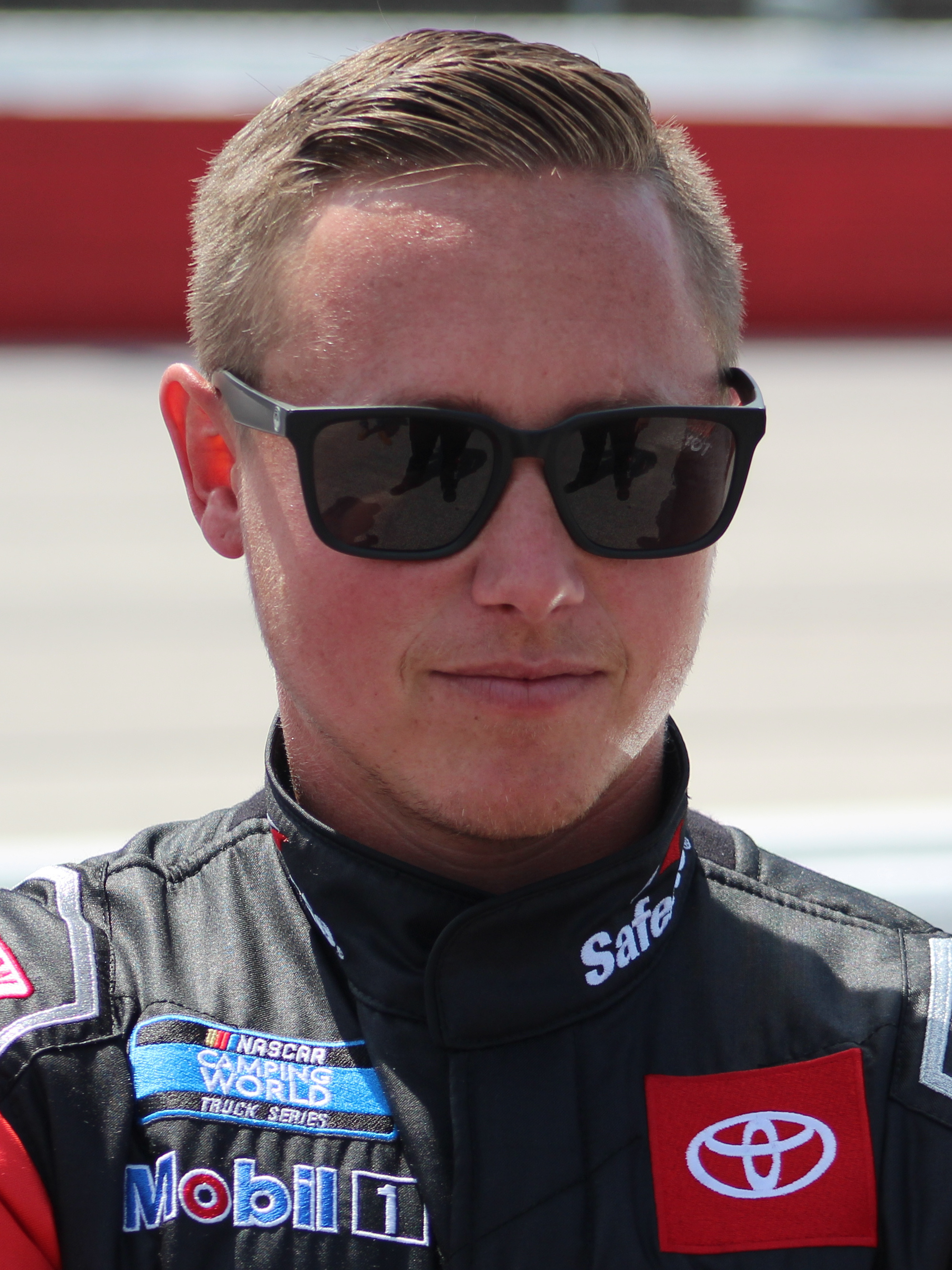
- Lupton at Darlington Raceway in 2021
- Born: Dylan Jarin Lupton; December 7, 1993 (age 32); Sacramento, California, U.S.
- Achievements: 2010 Langers Juice S-2 Sportsman Series Champion

NASCAR Cup Series career
- 4 races run over 1 year
- 2016 position: 54th
- Best finish: 54th (2016)
- First race: 2016 Toyota/Save Mart 350 (Sonoma)
- Last race: 2016 Ford EcoBoost 400 (Homestead)
Wins	Top tens	Poles
0	0	0

NASCAR O'Reilly Auto Parts Series career
- 47 races run over 7 years
- 2024 position: 42nd
- Best finish: 30th (2015, 2017)
- First race: 2015 Axalta Faster. Tougher. Brighter. 200 (Phoenix)
- Last race: 2024 NASCAR Xfinity Series Championship Race (Phoenix)
Wins	Top tens	Poles
0	1	0

NASCAR FedEx Freight Truck Series career
- 16 races run over 6 years
- 2024 position: 90th
- Best finish: 28th (2019)
- First race: 2016 Fred's 250 (Talladega)
- Last race: 2024 Zip Buy Now, Pay Later 200 (Martinsville)
Wins	Top tens	Poles
0	4	0

ARCA Menards Series career
- 3 races run over 3 years
- Best finish: 50th (2020)
- First race: 2016 Lucas Oil 200 (Daytona)
- Last race: 2024 General Tire at The Glen 100 (Watkins Glen)
Wins	Top tens	Poles
0	2	0

ARCA Menards Series East career
- 1 race run over 1 year
- Best finish: 42nd (2015)
- First race: 2015 Bully Hill Vineyards 175 (Watkins Glen)
Wins	Top tens	Poles
0	1	0

ARCA Menards Series West career
- 34 races run over 5 years
- Best finish: 2nd (2014)
- First race: 2011 Toyota / TTC 150 (Kalispell)
- Last race: 2023 Portland 112 (Portland)
- First win: 2013 NAPA Auto Parts 150 Presented by Toyota (Evergreen)
- Last win: 2014 Armed Forces 150 (Bakersfield)
Wins	Top tens	Poles
2	23	0
- Statistics up to date as of November 10, 2024.

Dylan Jarin Lupton (born December 7, 1993) is an American professional stock car racing driver. He last competed part-time in the NASCAR Xfinity Series, driving the No. 15 Ford Mustang Dark Horse for AM Racing, part-time in the NASCAR Craftsman Truck Series, driving the No. 02 Chevrolet Silverado for Young's Motorsports, and part-time in the ARCA Menards Series driving the No. 30 Mustang for Rette Jones Racing. He has also competed in the NASCAR Cup Series, what is now the ARCA Menards Series East, and the ARCA Menards Series West in the past.

== Racing career ==
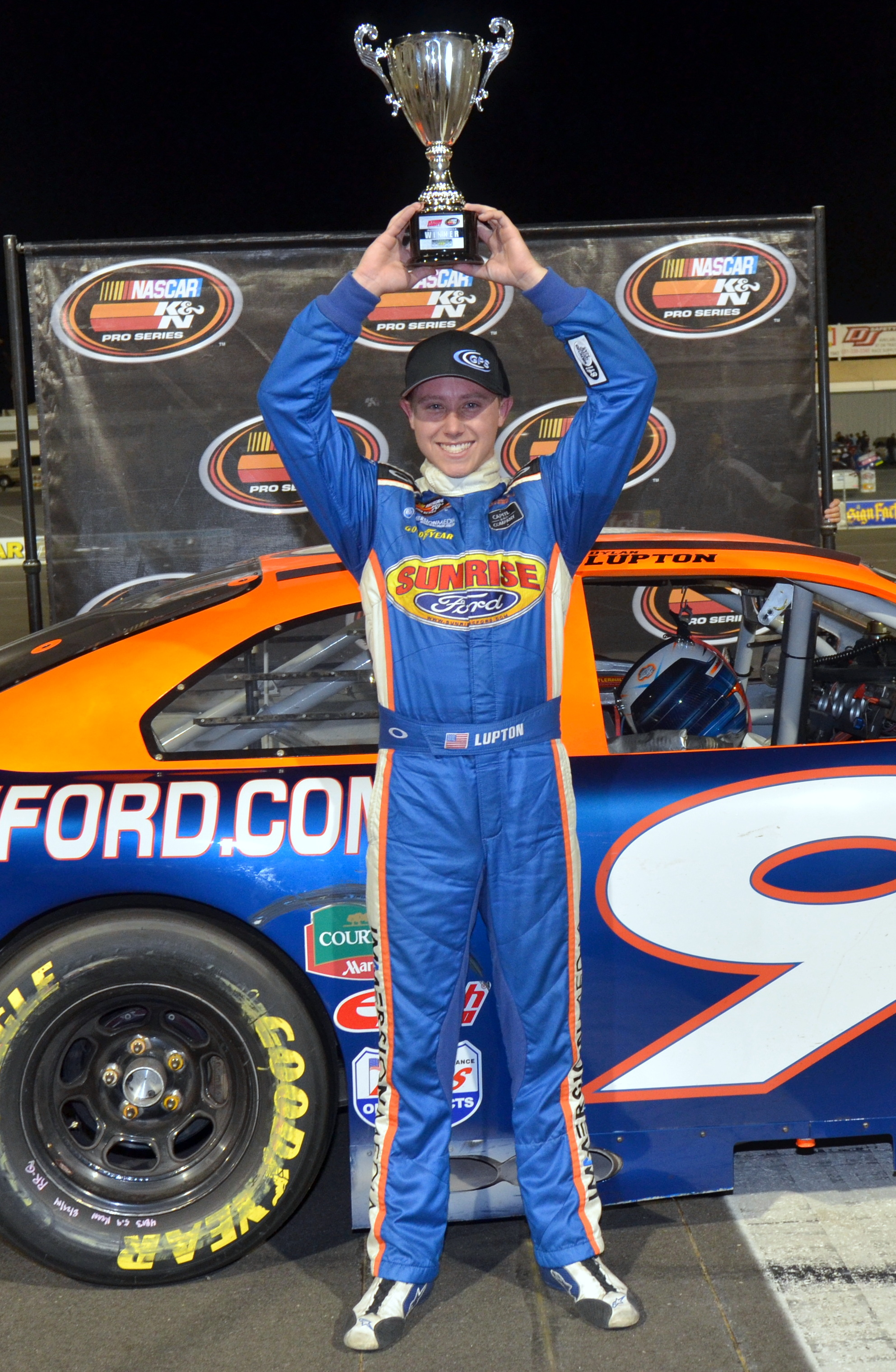
Lupton celebrating his West Series win at Kern County Raceway Park in 2014

Lupton began racing in 2010 in the Langers Juice S-2 Sportsman Series, which was a championship with fourteen races and those were all at Irwindale Event Center, then known as Toyota Speedway. Lupton managed to win three races and became champion with High Point Racing, just two points in front of teammate Roman Lagudi. In 2011, he got two partial rides in the K&N Pro Series West. He drove one race for team owner Greg Rayl and two races for Bill McAnally Racing, including races at All American Speedway and the new Phoenix International Raceway. His best result of the season was twelfth place at Montana Raceway Park. In 2013 and 2014, he got a full-time ride at Sunrise Ford Racing in the K&N Pro Series West and became runner-up in 2014, 17 points behind two-time champion Greg Pursley. He won twice, in 2013 at Evergreen Speedway and in 2014 at Kern County Raceway Park.

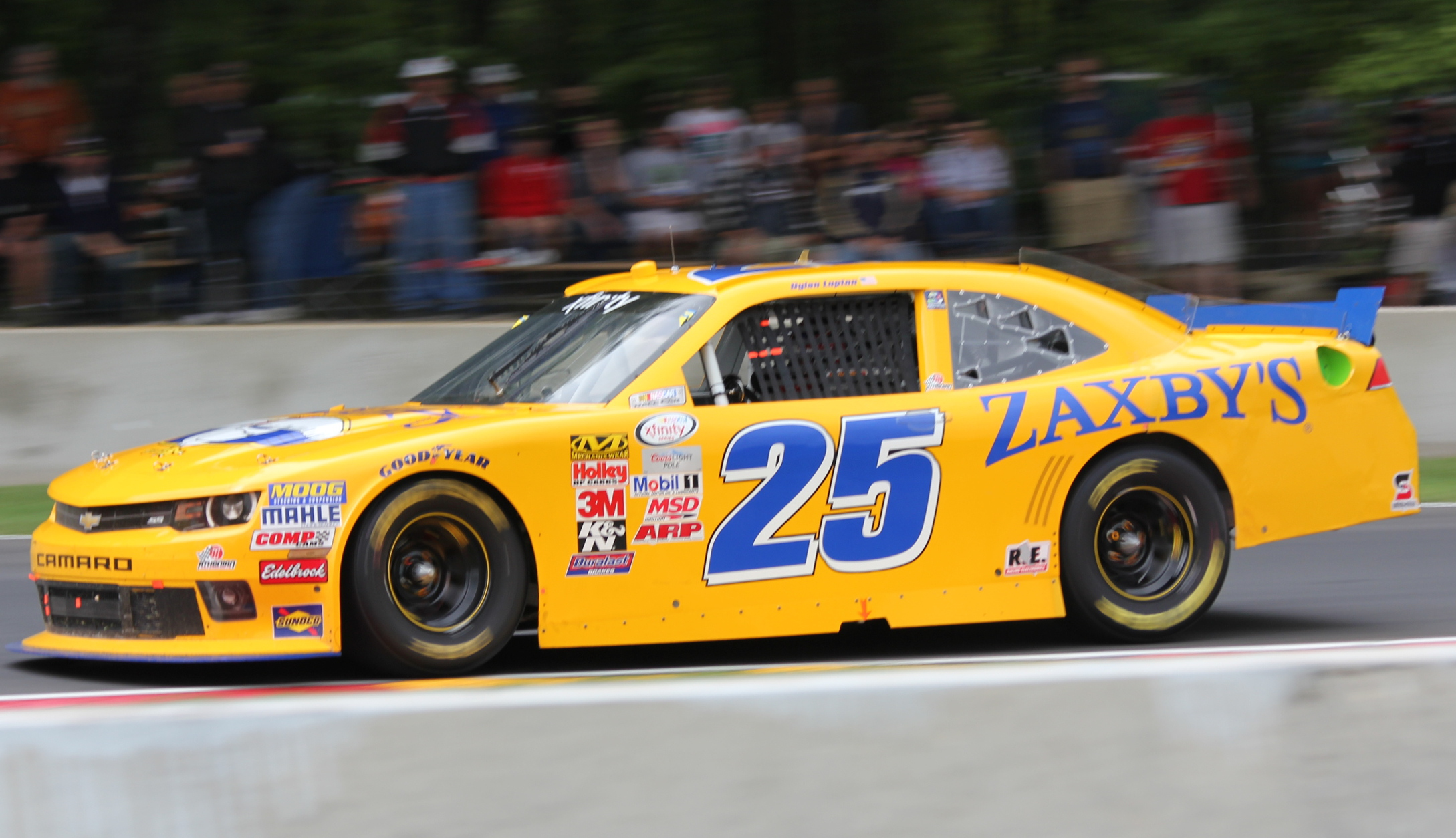
Lupton at Road America in 2015

On February 16, 2015, it was announced that Lupton had been signed by Athenian Motorsports to compete part-time in the 2015 NASCAR Xfinity Series. Lupton was hired to run a minimum of seven races in the No. 25 starting at Phoenix, with continued sponsorship from Zaxby's. Also that year, Lupton drove in one K&N Pro Series East race at Watkins Glen in order to gain road course experience, because two of his scheduled Xfinity races were the road course races at Road America and Mid-Ohio Sports Car Course. His road course runs were strong, finishing in fourth place in the Watkins Glen East Series race, and then earning his best finishes of the year in his Xfinity schedule with a ninth at Mid-Ohio and a thirteenth at Road America.

Lupton started the 2016 Xfinity season without a ride, however on March 1, 2016, it was announced that Lupton signed a deal to drive the No. 93 Chevy for RSS Racing for three races, starting at Las Vegas. However, the team withdrew from the Vegas race, delaying his debut until the following race at Phoenix, and was replaced by Josh Reaume at Las Vegas.

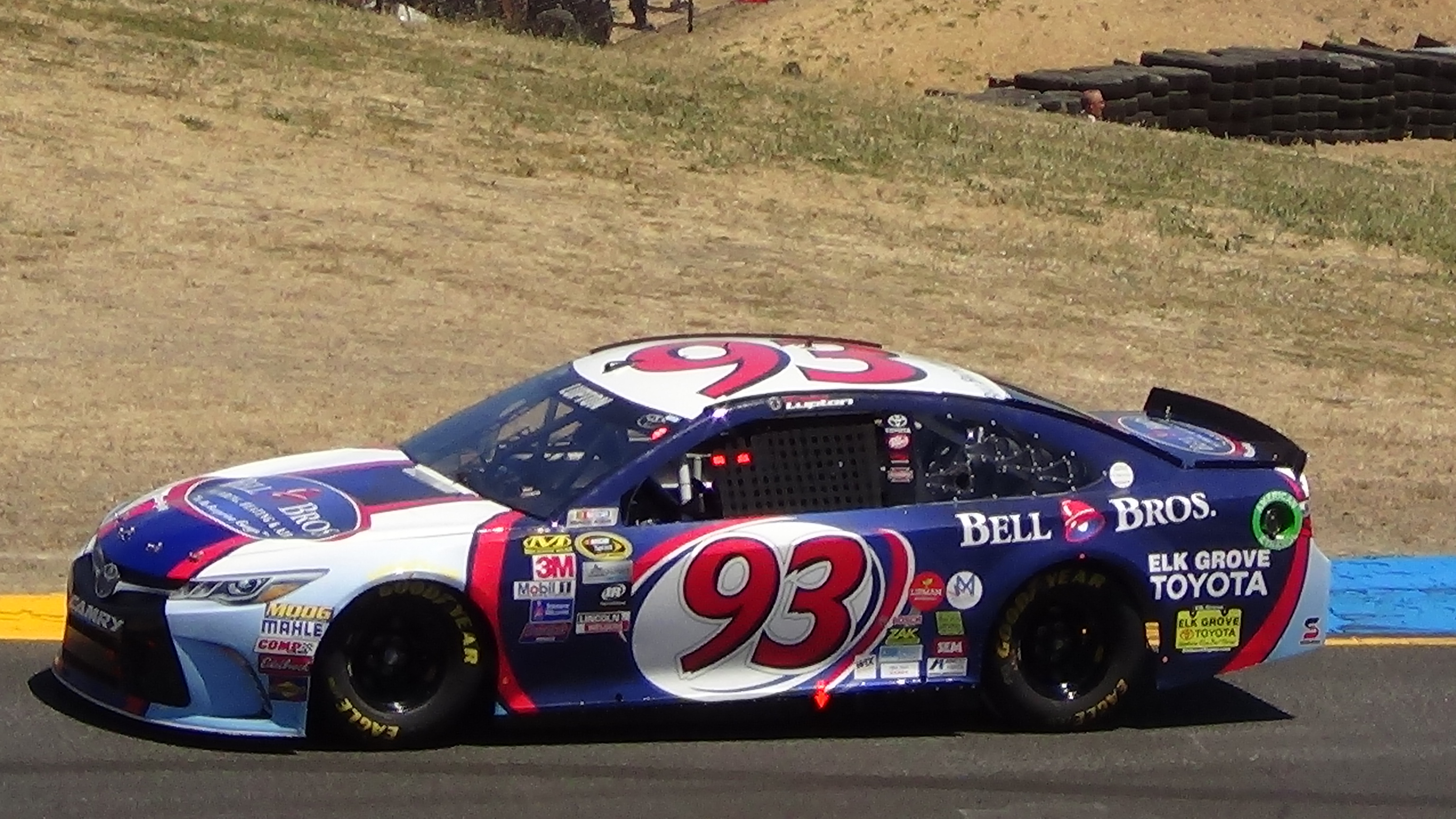
Lupton in his Cup Series debut at Sonoma in 2016

In 2016, Lupton joined BK Racing to attempt his Sprint Cup Series debut at the Toyota/Save Mart 350. Lupton would finish 35th in the race. He returned to the team at Richmond's Federated Auto Parts 400 in the No. 83. He would be involved in a big wreck, with his car ending up on top of Ryan Newman's car, but he would stay in the race and finish 25th. Lupton made his Truck Series debut at Talladega, driving the No. 02 Chevrolet for Young's Motorsports, he finished twelfth. Lupton then made his second Truck Series race at Phoenix, substituting John Wes Townley, earning a nineteenth place finish. A week later, Lupton joined Go Fas Racing in a one-race deal at Homestead, finishing 39th.

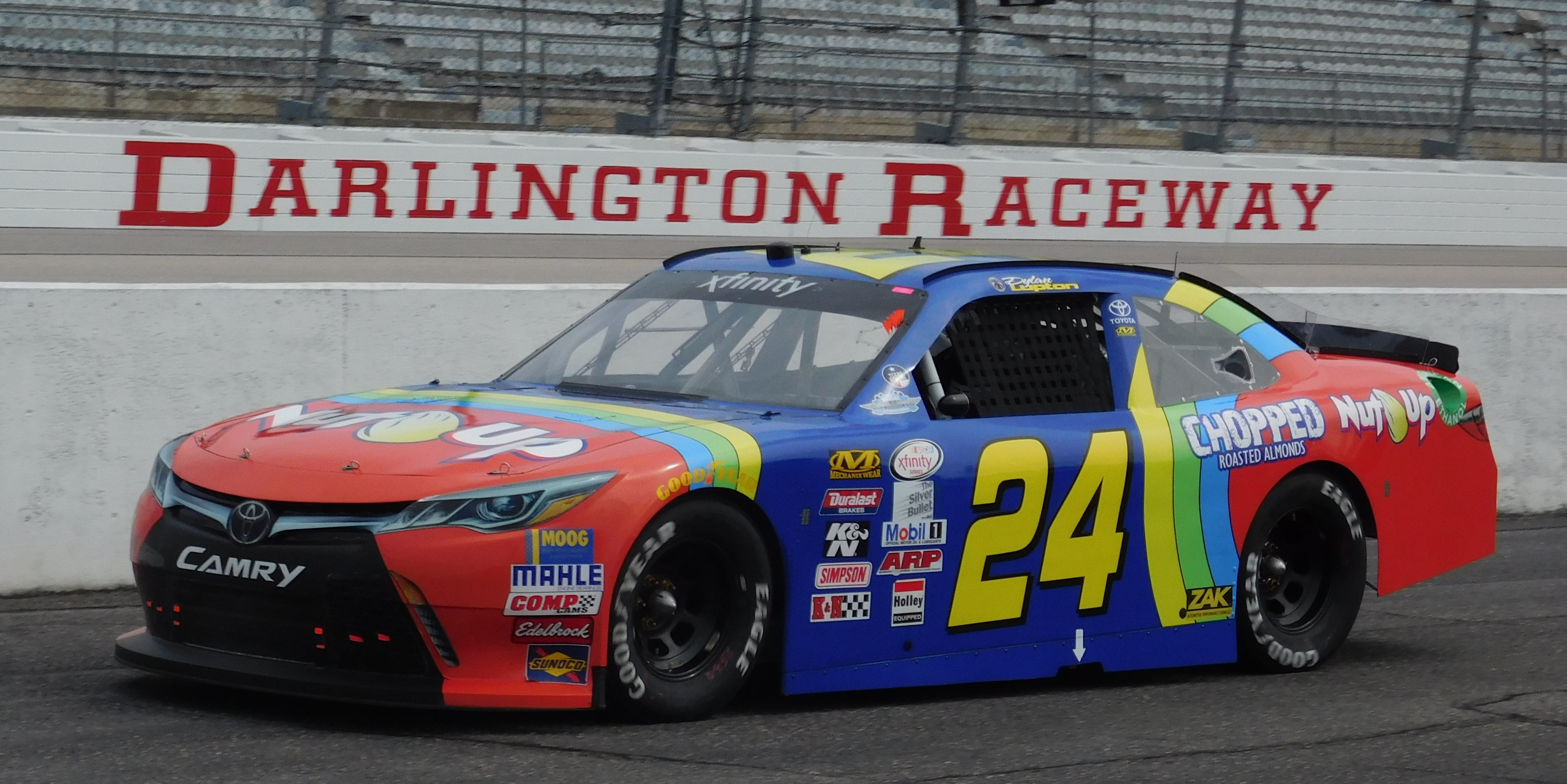
Lupton at Darlington in 2017 with his Jeff Gordon throwback scheme

Lupton ran part-time in the Xfinity Series in 2017 with a limited schedule in No. 24 for JGL Racing and announced in January 2018 that he and JGL were planning to run 21 races throughout the upcoming Xfinity season (with the hope to run the full schedule if more sponsorship was available). Lupton had a few top-25s but was disappointed for the most part in the other races, failing to finish Daytona, Las Vegas, Fontana, Bristol, Talladega, and Charlotte. He wasn't originally supposed to race in the Bristol race, but with the struggles of Tony Mrakovich in practice, JGL Racing chose Lupton to replace him. JGL shut down after 12 races into the season due to sponsorship issues and team owner James Whitener's health problems.

In June 2019, Lupton returned to the Truck Series for a six-race schedule in DGR-Crosley's No. 5 and No. 15 Toyota Tundras starting at Chicago. He also drove for Young's Motorsports again for one race in their No. 20 at Canadian Tire Motorsport Park. Lupton would not make any NASCAR starts in 2020 until September when he returned to DGR-Crosley, now a Ford team, to drive the No. 17 F-150 at Las Vegas, Texas, as well as make his second ARCA start, driving their No. 17 car in the season-finale at Kansas in October.

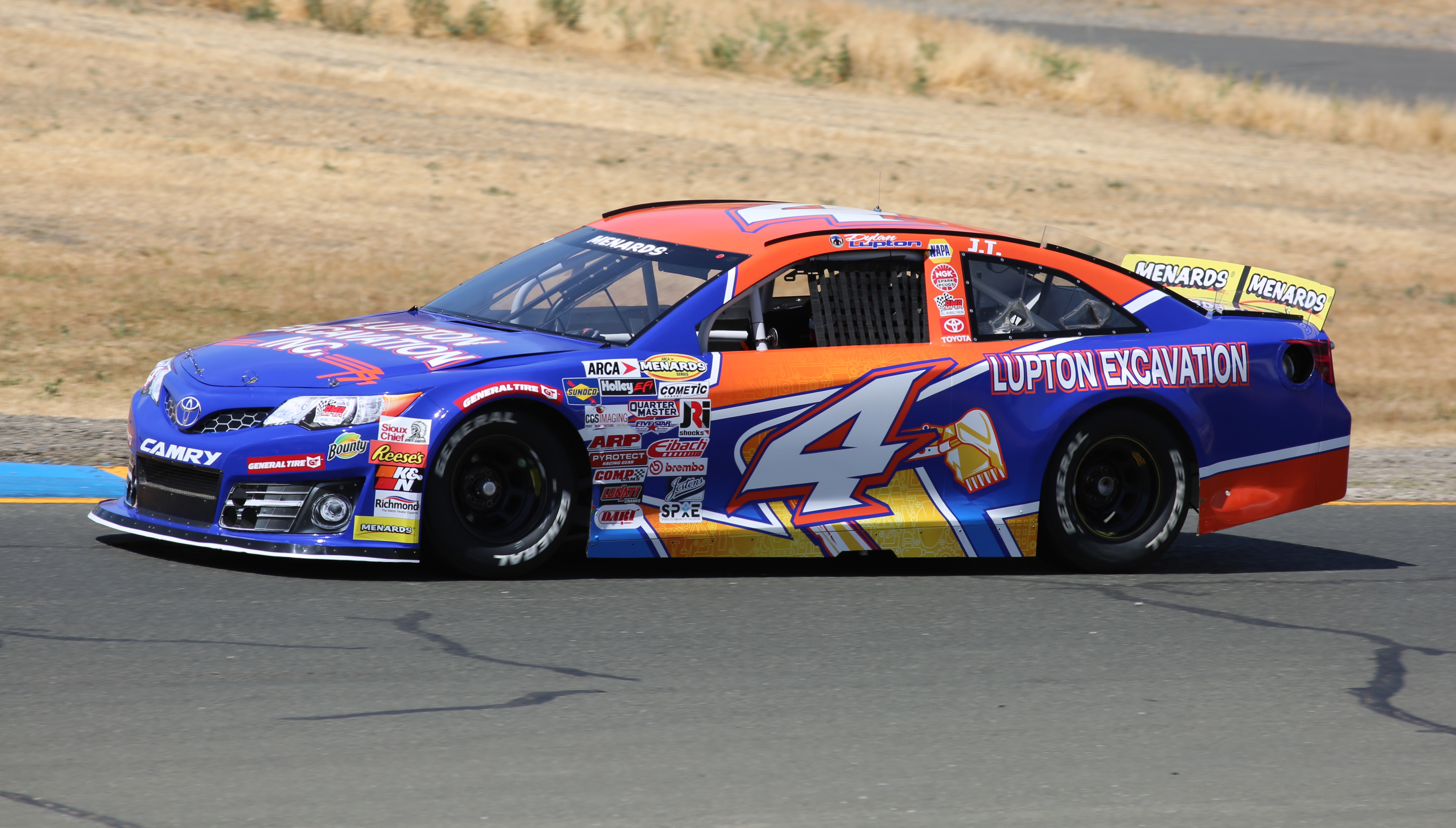
Lupton in the 2021 West Series race at Sonoma. He would finish 2nd in the race.

In 2021, Lupton returned to the West Series, now known as the ARCA Menards Series West, for the first time since his last full season in the series in 2014 to run the race at Sonoma for Bill McAnally Racing. Later in the year, Lupton ran three Truck Series races, one for Kyle Busch Motorsports in their No. 51 truck and two for Reaume Brothers Racing in their No. 34 truck, as well as four Xfinity Series races for Sam Hunt Racing in their No. 26 car.

On July 6, 2022, it was announced that Lupton would drive the No. 7 for Spire Motorsports in the Truck Series in the race at the Mid-Ohio Sports Car Course.

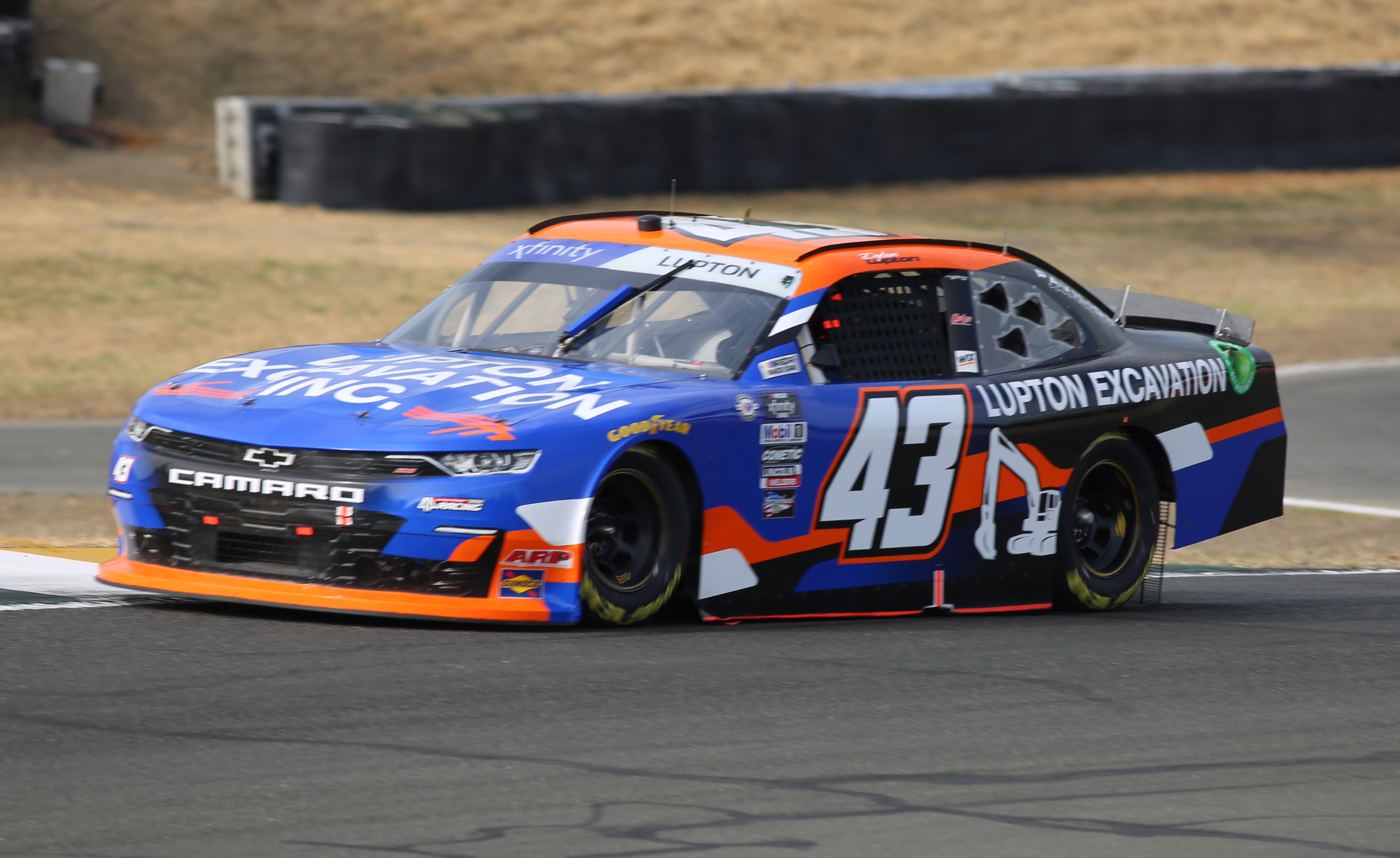
Lupton in the 2023 Xfinity Series race at Sonoma

Lupton competed in 2 Xfinity Series road course races in 2023 for Alpha Prime Racing, driving the No. 44 car at Portland and the No. 43 car at Sonoma. He also ran the ARCA Menards Series West race at Portland on the same weekend for Bill McAnally Racing.

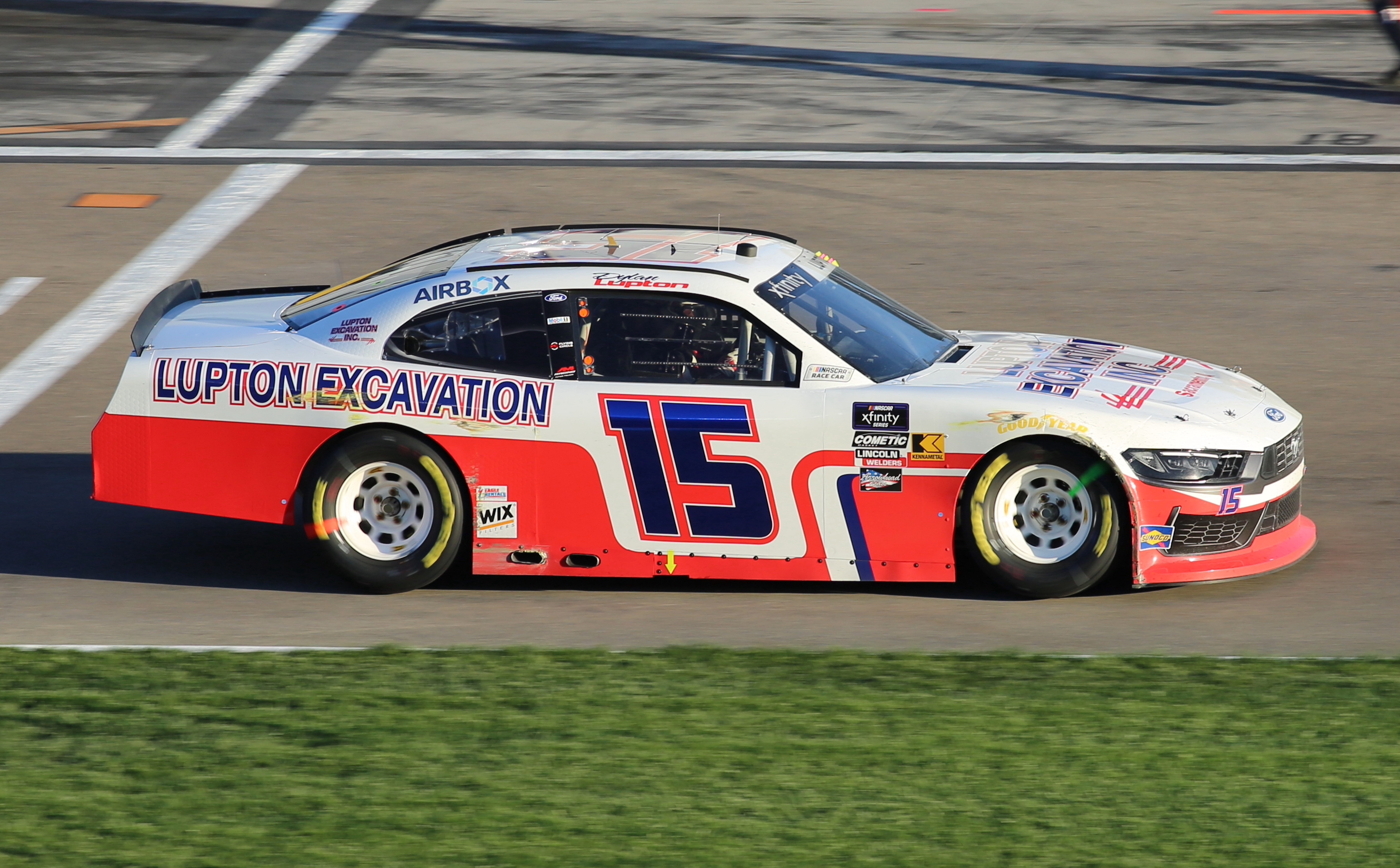
Lupton's No. 15 car at Las Vegas Motor Speedway in 2024

Lupton's first start of 2024 came in the ARCA Menards Series race at Watkins Glen where he drove the No. 30 car for Rette Jones Racing. On October 1, 2024, it was announced that Lupton would drive the No. 15 Ford for AM Racing for the remainder of the 2024 NASCAR Xfinity Series season. He would also return to Young's Motorsports for the first time since 2019, driving their No. 02 truck in the fall race at Martinsville, which would be his first Truck Series start since 2022.

== Personal life ==
Lupton graduated from the University of North Carolina at Charlotte in 2016 with a degree in finance. Despite sharing the same surname, he is not related to fellow racing driver Tyler Lupton.

== Motorsports career results ==
=== Racing career summary ===
Season	Series	Team	Races	Wins	Top 5	Top 10	Points	Position
2011	NASCAR K&N Pro Series West	GSR Racing	1	0	0	0	288	45th
2011	NASCAR K&N Pro Series West	Gaunt Brothers Racing	2	0	0	0	288	45th
2013	NASCAR K&N Pro Series West	Sunrise Ford Racing	15	1	4	12	522	5th
2014	NASCAR K&N Pro Series West	Sunrise Ford Racing	14	1	8	12	560	**2nd**
2015	NASCAR K&N Pro Series East	Jefferson Pitts Racing	1	0	1	1	40	37th
2015	NASCAR Xfinity Series	Athenian Motorsports	8	0	0	1	178	30th
2016	ARCA Racing Series	Empire Racing	1	0	0	0	110	126th
2016	NASCAR Camping World Truck Series	Young's Motorsports	1	0	0	0	0	NC†
2016	NASCAR Camping World Truck Series	Athenian Motorsports	1	0	0	0	0	NC†
2016	NASCAR Xfinity Series	RSS Racing	2	0	0	0	27	58th
2016	NASCAR Sprint Cup Series	BK Racing	3	0	0	0	0	NC†
2016	NASCAR Sprint Cup Series	Go Fas Racing	1	0	0	0	0	NC†
2017	NASCAR Xfinity Series	JGL Racing	14	0	0	0	197	30th
2018	NASCAR Xfinity Series	JGL Racing	11	0	0	0	103	39th
2019	NASCAR Gander Outdoors Truck Series	DGR-Crosley	5	0	1	3	145	28th
2019	NASCAR Gander Outdoors Truck Series	Young's Motorsports	1	0	0	0	145	28th
2020	ARCA Menards Series	DGR-Crosley	1	0	1	1	40	50th
2020	NASCAR Gander Outdoors Truck Series	DGR-Crosley	3	0	0	1	73	44th
2021	ARCA Menards Series West	Bill McAnally Racing	1	0	1	1	42	37th
2021	NASCAR Camping World Truck Series	Kyle Busch Motorsports	1	0	0	0	0	NC†
2021	NASCAR Camping World Truck Series	Reaume Brothers Racing	2	0	0	0	0	NC†
2021	NASCAR Xfinity Series	Sam Hunt Racing	4	0	0	0	33	56th
2022	NASCAR Camping World Truck Series	Spire Motorsports	1	0	0	0	5	76th
2023	ARCA Menards Series West	Bill McAnally Racing	1	0	0	0	23	64th
2023	NASCAR Xfinity Series	Alpha Prime Racing	2	0	0	0	21	56th
2024	ARCA Menards Series	Rette Jones Racing	1	0	0	1	34	86th
2024	NASCAR Craftsman Truck Series	Young's Motorsports	1	0	0	0	0	NC†
2024	NASCAR Xfinity Series	AM Racing	6	0	0	0	73	42nd

^{†} As Lupton was a guest driver, he was ineligible for championship points.

=== NASCAR ===
(key) (Bold – Pole position awarded by qualifying time. Italics – Pole position earned by points standings or practice time. * – Most laps led.)

==== Sprint Cup Series ====
NASCAR Sprint Cup Series results
Year	Team	No.	Make	1	2	3	4	5	6	7	8	9	10	11	12	13	14	15	16	17	18	19	20	21	22	23	24	25	26	27	28	29	30	31	32	33	34	35	36	NSCC	Pts	Ref
2016	BK Racing	93	Toyota	DAY	ATL	LVS	PHO	CAL	MAR	TEX	BRI	RCH	TAL	KAN	DOV	CLT	POC	MCH	SON; 35	DAY	KEN	NHA	IND	POC	GLN	BRI	MCH	DAR												54th	0^{1}	
2016	BK Racing	83	Toyota																										RCH; 25	CHI	NHA	DOV	CLT	KAN	TAL	MAR; 31	TEX	PHO		54th	0^{1}	
2016	Go Fas Racing	32	Ford																																				HOM; 39	54th	0^{1}	

==== Xfinity Series ====
NASCAR Xfinity Series results
Year	Team	No.	Make	1	2	3	4	5	6	7	8	9	10	11	12	13	14	15	16	17	18	19	20	21	22	23	24	25	26	27	28	29	30	31	32	33	NXSC	Pts	Ref
2015	Athenian Motorsports	25	Chevy	DAY	ATL	LVS	PHO; 19	CAL	TEX	BRI	RCH; 28	TAL	IOW	CLT	DOV	MCH	CHI; 34	DAY	KEN	NHA; 24	IND	IOW; 17	GLN	MOH; 9	BRI	ROA; 13	DAR	RCH	CHI	KEN; 31	DOV	CLT	KAN	TEX	PHO	HOM	30th	178	
2016	RSS Racing	93	Chevy	DAY	ATL	LVS	PHO; 19	CAL; 36	TEX	BRI	RCH	TAL	DOV	CLT	POC	MCH	IOW	DAY	KEN	NHA	IND	IOW	GLN	MOH	BRI	ROA	DAR	RCH	CHI	KEN	DOV	CLT	KAN	TEX	PHO	HOM	58th	27	
2017	JGL Racing	24	Toyota	DAY	ATL	LVS	PHO	CAL	TEX	BRI	RCH; 12	TAL	CLT	DOV; 30	POC; 22	MCH; 24	IOW; 15	DAY	KEN	NHA; 22	IND	IOW; 25	GLN; 20	MOH; 27	BRI	ROA; 33	DAR; 30	RCH; 24	CHI	KEN	DOV	CLT	KAN; 16	TEX; 21	PHO	HOM	30th	197	
2018	JGL Racing	28	Ford	DAY; 27	ATL; 21	LVS; 40	PHO; 23	CAL; 33	TEX; 17	BRI; 31	RCH	TAL; 36	DOV; 24	CLT; 33	POC; 23	MCH	IOW	CHI	DAY	KEN	NHA	IOW	GLN	MOH	BRI	ROA	DAR	IND	LVS	RCH	ROV	DOV	KAN	TEX	PHO	HOM	39th	103	
2021	Sam Hunt Racing	26	Toyota	DAY	DRC	HOM	LVS	PHO	ATL	MAR	TAL	DAR	DOV	COA	CLT	MOH	TEX	NSH	POC	ROA	ATL	NHA	GLN	IRC	MCH	DAY	DAR	RCH	BRI	LVS; 35	TAL	ROV	TEX; 38	KAN; 27	MAR	PHO; 15	56th	33	
2023	Alpha Prime Racing	44	Chevy	DAY	CAL	LVS	PHO	ATL	COA	RCH	MAR	TAL	DOV	DAR	CLT	PIR; 29																					56th	21	
2023	Alpha Prime Racing	43	Chevy														SON; 24	NSH	CSC	ATL	NHA	POC	ROA	MCH	IRC	GLN	DAY	DAR	KAN	BRI	TEX	ROV	LVS	HOM	MAR	PHO	56th	21	
2024	AM Racing	15	Ford	DAY	ATL	LVS	PHO	COA	RCH	MAR	TEX	TAL	DOV	DAR	CLT	PIR	SON	IOW	NHA	NSH	CSC	POC	IND	MCH	DAY	DAR	ATL	GLN	BRI	KAN	TAL; 24	ROV; 27	LVS; 27	HOM; 32	MAR; 20	PHO; 19	42nd	73	

==== Craftsman Truck Series ====
NASCAR Craftsman Truck Series results
Year	Team	No.	Make	1	2	3	4	5	6	7	8	9	10	11	12	13	14	15	16	17	18	19	20	21	22	23	NCTC	Pts	Ref
2016	Young's Motorsports	02	Chevy	DAY	ATL	MAR	KAN	DOV	CLT	TEX	IOW	GTW	KEN	ELD	POC	BRI	MCH	MSP	CHI	NHA	LVS	TAL; 12	MAR	TEX			90th	0^{1}	
2016	Athenian Motorsports	05	Chevy																						PHO; 19	HOM	90th	0^{1}	
2019	DGR-Crosley	5	Toyota	DAY	ATL	LVS	MAR	TEX	DOV	KAN	CLT	TEX	IOW	GTW	CHI; 10							LVS; 10	TAL	MAR	PHO; 16	HOM; DNQ	28th	145	
2019	DGR-Crosley	15	Toyota													KEN; 5	POC	ELD	MCH	BRI; 27							28th	145	
2019	Young's Motorsports	20	Chevy																		MSP; 19						28th	145	
2020	DGR-Crosley	17	Ford	DAY	LVS	CLT	ATL	HOM	POC	KEN	TEX	KAN	KAN	MCH	DRC	DOV	GTW	DAR	RCH	BRI	LVS; 14	TAL	KAN	TEX; 8	MAR	PHO; 16	44th	73	
2021	Kyle Busch Motorsports	51	Toyota	DAY	DRC	LVS	ATL	BRD	RCH	KAN	DAR	COA	CLT	TEX	NSH	POC	KNX	GLN	GTW	DAR; 31	BRI						109th	0^{1}	
2021	Reaume Brothers Racing	34	Toyota																			LVS; 21	TAL; 26	MAR	PHO		109th	0^{1}	
2022	Spire Motorsports	7	Chevy	DAY	LVS	ATL	COA	MAR	BRD	DAR	KAN	TEX	CLT	GTW	SON	KNX	NSH	MOH; 32	POC	IRP	RCH	KAN	BRI	TAL	HOM	PHO	76th	5	
2024	Young's Motorsports	02	Chevy	DAY	ATL	LVS	BRI	COA	MAR	TEX	KAN	DAR	NWS	CLT	GTW	NSH	POC	IRP	RCH	MLW	BRI	KAN	TAL	HOM	MAR; 34	PHO	90th	0^{1}	

^{*} Season still in progress
^{1} Ineligible for series points

=== ARCA Menards Series ===
(key) (Bold – Pole position awarded by qualifying time. Italics – Pole position earned by points standings or practice time. * – Most laps led.)

ARCA Menards Series results
Year	Team	No.	Make	1	2	3	4	5	6	7	8	9	10	11	12	13	14	15	16	17	18	19	20	AMSC	Pts	Ref
2016	Empire Racing	82	Ford	DAY; 24	NSV	SLM	TAL	TOL	NJE	POC	MCH	MAD	WIN	IOW	IRP	POC	BLN	ISF	DSF	SLM	CHI	KEN	KAN	126th	110	
2020	DGR-Crosley	17	Ford	DAY	PHO	TAL	POC	IRP	KEN	IOW	KAN	TOL	TOL	MCH	DRC	GTW	L44	TOL	BRI	WIN	MEM	ISF	KAN; 4	50th	40	
2024	Rette Jones Racing	30	Ford	DAY	PHO	TAL	DOV	KAN	CLT	IOW	MOH	BLN	IRP	SLM	ELK	MCH	ISF	MLW	DSF	GLN; 10	BRI	KAN	TOL	86th	34	

==== K&N Pro Series East ====
NASCAR K&N Pro Series East results
Year	Team	No.	Make	1	2	3	4	5	6	7	8	9	10	11	12	13	14	NKNPSEC	Pts	Ref
2015	Jefferson Pitts Racing	55	Ford	NSM	GRE	BRI	IOW	BGS	LGY	COL	NHA	IOW	GLN; 4	MOT	VIR	RCH	DOV	37th	40	

==== ARCA Menards Series West ====
ARCA Menards Series West results
Year	Team	No.	Make	1	2	3	4	5	6	7	8	9	10	11	12	13	14	15	AMSW	Pts	Ref
2011	GSR Racing	07	Ford	PHO	AAS	MMP	IOW	LVS	SON	IRW	EVG	PIR	CNS	MRP; 12	SPO				45th	288	
2011	Gaunt Brothers Racing	75	Toyota													AAS; 18	PHO; 37		45th	288	
2013	Sunrise Ford Racing	9	Ford	PHO; 14	S99; 9	BIR; 4	IOW; 8	L44; 3	SON; 8	CNS; 10	IOW; 6	EVG; 1	SPO; 7	MMP; 3	SMP; 7	AAS; 15	KCR; 7	PHO; 28	5th	522	
2014	Sunrise Ford Racing	9	Ford	PHO; 6	IRW; 5	S99; 6	IOW; 20	KCR; 2	SON; 3	SLS; 8	CNS; 2	IOW; 27	EVG; 3*	KCR; 1	MMP; 2	AAS; 9	PHO; 5		2nd	560	
2021	Bill McAnally Racing	4	Toyota	PHO	SON; 2	IRW	CNS	IRW	PIR	LVS	AAS	PHO							37th	42	
2023	Bill McAnally Racing	24	Chevy	PHO	IRW	KCR	PIR; 21	SON	IRW	SHA	EVG	AAS	LVS	MAD	PHO				64th	23	
