= 2017 American Ethanol E15 250 =

14th race of the 2017 NASCAR Xfinity Series

Race details
- Race 14 of 33 in the 2017 NASCAR Xfinity Series
- Date: June 24, 2017
- Official name: 7th Annual American Ethanol E15 250
- Location: Newton, Iowa, Iowa Speedway
- Course: Permanent racing facility
- Course length: 0.875 miles (4.0 km)
- Distance: 250 laps, 218.75 mi (352.04 km)
- Scheduled distance: 250 laps, 218.75 mi (352.04 km)
- Average speed: 85.859 miles per hour (138.177 km/h)

Pole position
| Driver | Christopher Bell | Joe Gibbs Racing |
- Time: 23.630

Most laps led
| Driver | Christopher Bell | Joe Gibbs Racing |
- Laps: 152

Winner
| No. 9 | William Byron | JR Motorsports |

Television in the United States
- Network: FS1
- Announcers: Adam Alexander, Phil Parsons, Regan Smith

Radio in the United States
- Radio: Motor Racing Network

The 2017 American Ethanol E15 250 presented by Enogen was the 14th stock car race of the 2017 NASCAR Xfinity Series season and the seventh iteration of the event. The race was held on Sunday, June 24, 2017, Newton, Iowa, at Iowa Speedway, a 0.875 miles (1.408 km) permanent oval-shaped racetrack. The race took the scheduled 250 laps to complete. At race's end, William Byron, driving for JR Motorsports, would win the race after leading 78 laps. It was Byron's first career win in the xfinity series. To fill out the podium, Ryan Sieg of RSS Racing and Tyler Reddick of Chip Ganassi Racing would finish second and third, respectively.

== Entry list ==
- (R) denotes rookie driver.
- (i) denotes driver who is ineligible for series driver points.

| # | Driver | Team | Make |
|---|---|---|---|
| 00 | Cole Custer (R) | Stewart–Haas Racing | Ford |
| 0 | Garrett Smithley | JD Motorsports | Chevrolet |
| 01 | Harrison Rhodes | JD Motorsports | Chevrolet |
| 1 | Elliott Sadler | JR Motorsports | Chevrolet |
| 2 | Ben Kennedy (R) | Richard Childress Racing | Chevrolet |
| 3 | Scott Lagasse Jr. | Richard Childress Racing | Chevrolet |
| 4 | Ross Chastain | JD Motorsports | Chevrolet |
| 5 | Michael Annett | JR Motorsports | Chevrolet |
| 07 | Ray Black Jr. | SS-Green Light Racing | Chevrolet |
| 7 | Justin Allgaier | JR Motorsports | Chevrolet |
| 8 | B. J. McLeod | B. J. McLeod Motorsports | Chevrolet |
| 9 | William Byron (R) | JR Motorsports | Chevrolet |
| 11 | Blake Koch | Kaulig Racing | Chevrolet |
| 13 | Carl Long | MBM Motorsports | Toyota |
| 14 | J. J. Yeley | TriStar Motorsports | Toyota |
| 16 | Ryan Reed | Roush Fenway Racing | Ford |
| 18 | Kyle Benjamin | Joe Gibbs Racing | Toyota |
| 19 | Matt Tifft (R) | Joe Gibbs Racing | Toyota |
| 20 | Christopher Bell (i) | Joe Gibbs Racing | Toyota |
| 21 | Daniel Hemric (R) | Richard Childress Racing | Chevrolet |
| 22 | Sam Hornish Jr. | Team Penske | Ford |
| 23 | Spencer Gallagher (R) | GMS Racing | Chevrolet |
| 24 | Dylan Lupton | JGL Racing | Toyota |
| 28 | Dakoda Armstrong | JGL Racing | Toyota |
| 33 | Brandon Jones | Richard Childress Racing | Chevrolet |
| 39 | Ryan Sieg | RSS Racing | Chevrolet |
| 40 | Timmy Hill | MBM Motorsports | Dodge |
| 42 | Tyler Reddick | Chip Ganassi Racing | Chevrolet |
| 46 | Quin Houff | Precision Performance Motorsports | Chevrolet |
| 48 | Brennan Poole | Chip Ganassi Racing | Chevrolet |
| 51 | Jeremy Clements | Jeremy Clements Racing | Chevrolet |
| 52 | Joey Gase | Jimmy Means Racing | Chevrolet |
| 60 | Ty Majeski | Roush Fenway Racing | Ford |
| 62 | Brendan Gaughan | Richard Childress Racing | Chevrolet |
| 74 | Mike Harmon | Mike Harmon Racing | Dodge |
| 78 | Tommy Joe Martins | B. J. McLeod Motorsports | Chevrolet |
| 89 | Morgan Shepherd | Shepherd Racing Ventures | Chevrolet |
| 90 | Mario Gosselin | King Autosport | Chevrolet |
| 93 | Jeff Green | RSS Racing | Chevrolet |
| 99 | David Starr | B. J. McLeod Motorsports with SS-Green Light Racing | Chevrolet |
Official entry list

== Practice ==
=== First practice ===
The first practice session was held on Friday, July 23, at 1:00 PM CST. The session would last for 55 minutes. Kyle Benjamin of Joe Gibbs Racing would set the fastest time in the session, with a lap of 23.966 and an average speed of 131.436 mph (211.526 km/h).

| Pos | # | Driver | Team | Make | Time | Speed |
|---|---|---|---|---|---|---|
| 1 | 18 | Kyle Benjamin | Joe Gibbs Racing | Toyota | 23.966 | 131.436 |
| 2 | 19 | Matt Tifft (R) | Joe Gibbs Racing | Toyota | 24.024 | 131.119 |
| 3 | 33 | Brandon Jones | Richard Childress Racing | Chevrolet | 24.152 | 130.424 |
Full first practice results

=== Final practice ===
The final practice session was held on Friday, June 23, at 4:00 PM EST. The session would last for 55 minutes. Cole Custer of Stewart–Haas Racing would set the fastest time in the session, with a lap of 23.834 and an average speed of 132.164 mph (212.697 km/h).

| Pos | # | Driver | Team | Make | Time | Speed |
|---|---|---|---|---|---|---|
| 1 | 00 | Cole Custer (R) | Stewart–Haas Racing | Ford | 23.834 | 132.164 |
| 2 | 20 | Christopher Bell (i) | Joe Gibbs Racing | Toyota | 23.973 | 131.398 |
| 3 | 11 | Blake Koch | Kaulig Racing | Chevrolet | 24.057 | 130.939 |
Full final practice results

== Qualifying ==
Qualifying was held on Saturday, June 24, at 5:15 PM EST. Since Iowa Speedway is under 2 miles (3.2 km) in length, the qualifying system was a multi-car system that included three rounds. The first round was 15 minutes, where every driver would be able to set a lap within the 15 minutes. Then, the second round would consist of the fastest 24 cars in Round 1, and drivers would have 10 minutes to set a lap. Round 3 consisted of the fastest 12 drivers from Round 2, and the drivers would have 5 minutes to set a time. Whoever was fastest in Round 3 would win the pole.

Christopher Bell of Joe Gibbs Racing would win the pole after advancing from both preliminary rounds and setting the fastest lap in Round 3, with a time of 23.630 and an average speed of 133.305 miles per hour (214.534 km/h).

No drivers would fail to qualify.

=== Full qualifying results ===
| Pos | # | Driver | Team | Make | Time (R1) | Speed (R1) | Time (R2) | Speed (R2) | Time (R3) | Speed (R3) |
|---|---|---|---|---|---|---|---|---|---|---|
| 1 | 20 | Christopher Bell (i) | Joe Gibbs Racing | Toyota | 23.610 | 133.418 | 23.542 | 133.803 | 23.630 | 133.305 |
| 2 | 18 | Kyle Benjamin | Joe Gibbs Racing | Toyota | 23.413 | 134.541 | 23.568 | 133.656 | 23.632 | 133.294 |
| 3 | 22 | Sam Hornish Jr. | Team Penske | Ford | 23.640 | 133.249 | 23.680 | 133.024 | 23.638 | 133.260 |
| 4 | 1 | Elliott Sadler | JR Motorsports | Chevrolet | 23.857 | 132.037 | 23.676 | 133.046 | 23.686 | 132.990 |
| 5 | 7 | Justin Allgaier | JR Motorsports | Chevrolet | 23.616 | 133.384 | 23.600 | 133.475 | 23.704 | 132.889 |
| 6 | 9 | William Byron (R) | JR Motorsports | Chevrolet | 23.723 | 132.783 | 23.652 | 133.181 | 23.770 | 132.520 |
| 7 | 28 | Dakoda Armstrong | JGL Racing | Toyota | 23.777 | 132.481 | 23.689 | 132.973 | 23.812 | 132.286 |
| 8 | 48 | Brennan Poole | Chip Ganassi Racing | Chevrolet | 23.864 | 131.998 | 23.790 | 132.409 | 23.830 | 132.186 |
| 9 | 19 | Matt Tifft (R) | Joe Gibbs Racing | Toyota | 23.678 | 133.035 | 23.590 | 133.531 | 23.853 | 132.059 |
| 10 | 60 | Ty Majeski | Roush Fenway Racing | Ford | 23.832 | 132.175 | 23.830 | 132.186 | 23.864 | 131.998 |
| 11 | 21 | Daniel Hemric (R) | Richard Childress Racing | Chevrolet | 23.762 | 132.565 | 23.818 | 132.253 | 23.896 | 131.821 |
| 12 | 3 | Scott Lagasse Jr. | Richard Childress Racing | Chevrolet | 23.575 | 133.616 | 23.842 | 132.120 | 23.938 | 131.590 |
Eliminated in Round 2
| 13 | 11 | Blake Koch | Kaulig Racing | Chevrolet | 23.892 | 131.843 | 28.871 | 131.959 | - | - |
| 14 | 4 | Ross Chastain | JD Motorsports | Chevrolet | 23.834 | 132.164 | 23.873 | 131.948 | - | - |
| 15 | 42 | Tyler Reddick | Chip Ganassi Racing | Chevrolet | 23.852 | 132.064 | 23.893 | 131.838 | - | - |
| 16 | 62 | Brendan Gaughan | Richard Childress Racing | Chevrolet | 23.883 | 131.893 | 23.914 | 131.722 | - | - |
| 17 | 16 | Ryan Reed | Roush Fenway Racing | Ford | 24.012 | 131.184 | 23.969 | 132.420 | - | - |
| 18 | 51 | Jeremy Clements | Jeremy Clements Racing | Chevrolet | 23.952 | 131.513 | 24.049 | 130.983 | - | - |
| 19 | 23 | Spencer Gallagher (R) | GMS Racing | Chevrolet | 23.925 | 131.661 | 24.052 | 130.966 | - | - |
| 20 | 5 | Michael Annett | JR Motorsports | Chevrolet | 23.929 | 131.639 | 24.065 | 130.895 | - | - |
| 21 | 2 | Ben Kennedy (R) | Richard Childress Racing | Chevrolet | 23.890 | 131.854 | 24.087 | 130.776 | - | - |
| 22 | 39 | Ryan Sieg | RSS Racing | Chevrolet | 23.941 | 131.573 | 24.110 | 130.651 | - | - |
| 23 | 33 | Brandon Jones | Richard Childress Racing | Chevrolet | 23.988 | 131.316 | 24.242 | 129.940 | - | - |
| 24 | 00 | Cole Custer (R) | Stewart–Haas Racing | Ford | 23.839 | 132.136 | - | - | - | - |
Eliminated in Round 1
| 25 | 14 | J. J. Yeley | TriStar Motorsports | Toyota | 24.021 | 131.135 | - | - | - | - |
| 26 | 8 | B. J. McLeod | B. J. McLeod Motorsports | Chevrolet | 24.030 | 131.086 | - | - | - | - |
| 27 | 46 | Quin Houff | Precision Performance Motorsports | Chevrolet | 24.037 | 131.048 | - | - | - | - |
| 28 | 24 | Dylan Lupton | JGL Racing | Toyota | 24.105 | 130.678 | - | - | - | - |
| 29 | 01 | Harrison Rhodes | JD Motorsports | Chevrolet | 24.108 | 130.662 | - | - | - | - |
| 30 | 78 | Tommy Joe Martins | B. J. McLeod Motorsports | Chevrolet | 24.191 | 130.214 | - | - | - | - |
| 31 | 0 | Garrett Smithley | JD Motorsports | Chevrolet | 24.206 | 130.133 | - | - | - | - |
| 32 | 99 | David Starr | BJMM with SS-Green Light Racing | Chevrolet | 24.295 | 129.656 | - | - | - | - |
| 33 | 90 | Mario Gosselin | King Autosport | Chevrolet | 24.314 | 129.555 | - | - | - | - |
Qualified by owner's points
| 34 | 07 | Ray Black Jr. | SS-Green Light Racing | Chevrolet | 24.415 | 129.019 | - | - | - | - |
| 35 | 93 | Jeff Green | RSS Racing | Chevrolet | 24.607 | 128.012 | - | - | - | - |
| 36 | 89 | Morgan Shepherd | Shepherd Racing Ventures | Chevrolet | 24.698 | 127.541 | - | - | - | - |
| 37 | 52 | Joey Gase | Jimmy Means Racing | Chevrolet | 24.699 | 127.536 | - | - | - | - |
| 38 | 40 | Timmy Hill | MBM Motorsports | Dodge | 24.739 | 127.329 | - | - | - | - |
| 39 | 13 | Carl Long | MBM Motorsports | Toyota | 25.252 | 124.743 | - | - | - | - |
| 40 | 74 | Mike Harmon | Mike Harmon Racing | Dodge | 25.537 | 123.350 | - | - | - | - |
Official qualifying results
Official starting lineup

== Race results ==
Stage 1 Laps: 60

| Pos | # | Driver | Team | Make | Pts |
|---|---|---|---|---|---|
| 1 | 20 | Christopher Bell (i) | Joe Gibbs Racing | Toyota | 0 |
| 2 | 22 | Sam Hornish Jr. | Team Penske | Ford | 9 |
| 3 | 9 | William Byron (R) | JR Motorsports | Chevrolet | 8 |
| 4 | 7 | Justin Allgaier | JR Motorsports | Chevrolet | 7 |
| 5 | 1 | Elliott Sadler | JR Motorsports | Chevrolet | 6 |
| 6 | 18 | Kyle Benjamin | Joe Gibbs Racing | Toyota | 5 |
| 7 | 14 | J. J. Yeley | TriStar Motorsports | Toyota | 4 |
| 8 | 3 | Scott Lagasse Jr. | Richard Childress Racing | Chevrolet | 3 |
| 9 | 16 | Ryan Reed | Roush Fenway Racing | Ford | 2 |
| 10 | 21 | Daniel Hemric (R) | Richard Childress Racing | Chevrolet | 1 |

Stage 2 Laps: 60

| Pos | # | Driver | Team | Make | Pts |
|---|---|---|---|---|---|
| 1 | 62 | Brendan Gaughan | Richard Childress Racing | Chevrolet | 10 |
| 2 | 9 | William Byron (R) | JR Motorsports | Chevrolet | 9 |
| 3 | 20 | Christopher Bell (i) | Joe Gibbs Racing | Toyota | 0 |
| 4 | 1 | Elliott Sadler | JR Motorsports | Chevrolet | 7 |
| 5 | 51 | Jeremy Clements | Jeremy Clements Racing | Chevrolet | 6 |
| 6 | 2 | Ben Kennedy (R) | Richard Childress Racing | Chevrolet | 5 |
| 7 | 39 | Ryan Sieg | RSS Racing | Chevrolet | 4 |
| 8 | 7 | Justin Allgaier | JR Motorsports | Chevrolet | 3 |
| 9 | 16 | Ryan Reed | Roush Fenway Racing | Ford | 2 |
| 10 | 28 | Dakoda Armstrong | JGL Racing | Toyota | 1 |

Stage 3 Laps: 130

| Pos | # | Driver | Team | Make | Laps | Led | Status | Pts |
|---|---|---|---|---|---|---|---|---|
| 1 | 9 | William Byron (R) | JR Motorsports | Chevrolet | 250 | 78 | Running | 57 |
| 2 | 39 | Ryan Sieg | RSS Racing | Chevrolet | 250 | 0 | Running | 39 |
| 3 | 42 | Tyler Reddick | Chip Ganassi Racing | Chevrolet | 250 | 0 | Running | 34 |
| 4 | 4 | Ross Chastain | JD Motorsports | Chevrolet | 250 | 0 | Running | 33 |
| 5 | 28 | Dakoda Armstrong | JGL Racing | Toyota | 250 | 0 | Running | 33 |
| 6 | 5 | Michael Annett | JR Motorsports | Chevrolet | 250 | 0 | Running | 31 |
| 7 | 51 | Jeremy Clements | Jeremy Clements Racing | Chevrolet | 250 | 0 | Running | 36 |
| 8 | 1 | Elliott Sadler | JR Motorsports | Chevrolet | 250 | 0 | Running | 42 |
| 9 | 7 | Justin Allgaier | JR Motorsports | Chevrolet | 250 | 5 | Running | 38 |
| 10 | 0 | Garrett Smithley | JD Motorsports | Chevrolet | 250 | 0 | Running | 27 |
| 11 | 78 | Tommy Joe Martins | B. J. McLeod Motorsports | Chevrolet | 250 | 0 | Running | 26 |
| 12 | 46 | Quin Houff | Precision Performance Motorsports | Chevrolet | 250 | 0 | Running | 25 |
| 13 | 14 | J. J. Yeley | TriStar Motorsports | Toyota | 250 | 0 | Running | 28 |
| 14 | 99 | David Starr | BJMM with SS-Green Light Racing | Chevrolet | 250 | 0 | Running | 23 |
| 15 | 24 | Dylan Lupton | JGL Racing | Toyota | 250 | 5 | Running | 22 |
| 16 | 20 | Christopher Bell (i) | Joe Gibbs Racing | Toyota | 250 | 152 | Running | 0 |
| 17 | 8 | B. J. McLeod | B. J. McLeod Motorsports | Chevrolet | 250 | 0 | Running | 20 |
| 18 | 52 | Joey Gase | Jimmy Means Racing | Chevrolet | 250 | 0 | Running | 19 |
| 19 | 16 | Ryan Reed | Roush Fenway Racing | Ford | 250 | 0 | Running | 22 |
| 20 | 2 | Ben Kennedy (R) | Richard Childress Racing | Chevrolet | 249 | 0 | Running | 22 |
| 21 | 21 | Daniel Hemric (R) | Richard Childress Racing | Chevrolet | 249 | 0 | Running | 17 |
| 22 | 19 | Matt Tifft (R) | Joe Gibbs Racing | Toyota | 249 | 0 | Running | 15 |
| 23 | 33 | Brandon Jones | Richard Childress Racing | Chevrolet | 249 | 0 | Running | 14 |
| 24 | 00 | Cole Custer (R) | Stewart–Haas Racing | Ford | 249 | 0 | Running | 13 |
| 25 | 11 | Blake Koch | Kaulig Racing | Chevrolet | 249 | 0 | Running | 12 |
| 26 | 62 | Brendan Gaughan | Richard Childress Racing | Chevrolet | 249 | 9 | Running | 21 |
| 27 | 48 | Brennan Poole | Chip Ganassi Racing | Chevrolet | 249 | 0 | Running | 10 |
| 28 | 40 | Timmy Hill | MBM Motorsports | Dodge | 247 | 0 | Running | 9 |
| 29 | 07 | Ray Black Jr. | SS-Green Light Racing | Chevrolet | 246 | 1 | Running | 8 |
| 30 | 23 | Spencer Gallagher (R) | GMS Racing | Chevrolet | 244 | 0 | Running | 7 |
| 31 | 18 | Kyle Benjamin | Joe Gibbs Racing | Toyota | 241 | 0 | Running | 11 |
| 32 | 3 | Scott Lagasse Jr. | Richard Childress Racing | Chevrolet | 236 | 0 | Running | 8 |
| 33 | 90 | Mario Gosselin | King Autosport | Chevrolet | 161 | 0 | Accident | 4 |
| 34 | 60 | Ty Majeski | Roush Fenway Racing | Ford | 143 | 0 | Accident | 3 |
| 35 | 74 | Mike Harmon | Mike Harmon Racing | Chevrolet | 121 | 0 | Engine | 2 |
| 36 | 01 | Harrison Rhodes | JD Motorsports | Chevrolet | 118 | 0 | Engine | 1 |
| 37 | 22 | Sam Hornish Jr. | Team Penske | Ford | 78 | 0 | Accident | 10 |
| 38 | 13 | Carl Long | MBM Motorsports | Toyota | 18 | 0 | Brakes | 1 |
| 39 | 89 | Morgan Shepherd | Shepherd Racing Ventures | Chevrolet | 16 | 0 | Vibration | 1 |
| 40 | 93 | Jeff Green | RSS Racing | Chevrolet | 6 | 0 | Electrical | 1 |
Official race results

== Standings after the race ==
Drivers' Championship standings

| Pos | Driver | Points |
|---|---|---|
| 1 | Elliott Sadler | 502 |
| 2 | Justin Allgaier | 477 (–25) |
| 3 | William Byron | 445 (–57) |
| 4 | Daniel Hemric | 356 (–146) |
| 5 | Ryan Reed | 347 (–155) |
| 6 | Brennan Poole | 336 (–166) |
| 7 | Cole Custer | 322 (–180) |
| 8 | Bubba Wallace | 321 (–181) |
| 9 | Matt Tifft | 310 (–192) |
| 10 | Michael Annett | 304 (–198) |
| 11 | Dakoda Armstrong | 276 (–226) |
| 12 | Blake Koch | 275 (–227) |
Official driver's standings

- Note: Only the first 12 positions are included for the driver standings.

| Previous race: 2017 Irish Hills 250 | NASCAR Xfinity Series; 2017 season | Next race: 2017 Coca-Cola Firecracker 250 |
