= 2016 Toyota/Save Mart 350 =

Race details
- Race 16 of 36 in the 2016 NASCAR Sprint Cup Series
- Date: June 26, 2016
- Location: Sonoma Raceway in Sonoma, California
- Course: Permanent racing facility
- Course length: 1.99 miles (3.2 km)
- Distance: 110 laps, 218.9 mi (352 km)
- Average speed: 80.966 miles per hour (130.302 km/h)

Pole position
Driver	Carl Edwards	Joe Gibbs Racing
- Time: 74.799 seconds

Most laps led
Driver	Denny Hamlin	Joe Gibbs Racing
- Laps: 33

Winner
No. 14	Tony Stewart	Stewart–Haas Racing

Television in the United States
- Network: FS1
- Announcers: Mike Joy, Jeff Gordon and Darrell Waltrip
- Nielsen ratings: 2.22 (Overnight); 2.2 (Final); 3.9 million viewers

Radio in the United States
- Radio: PRN
- Booth announcers: Doug Rice, Mark Garrow and Wendy Venturini
- Turn announcers: Pat Patterson (2, 3 & 3a), Brad Gillie (4a & 7a) and Rob Albright (10 & 11)

The 2016 Toyota/Save Mart 350 was a NASCAR Sprint Cup Series stock car race held on June 26, 2016 at Sonoma Raceway in Sonoma, California. Contested over 110 laps on the 1.99-mile (3.20 km) road course, it was the 16th race of the 2016 NASCAR Sprint Cup Series.

The race had 12 lead changes among different cautions and 4 cautions for 10 laps. This was three-time series champion Tony Stewart's 49th and final career victory.

== Background ==
Layout of Sonoma Raceway, the track where the race was held.

Sonoma Raceway, formerly Sears Point Raceway and Infineon Raceway is a 2.52-mile (4.06 km) road course and drag strip located on the landform known as Sears Point in the southern Sonoma Mountains in Sonoma, California, USA.

=== Entry list ===
The preliminary entry list for the race included forty-one cars and was released on June 3, 2016, at 12:29 pm ET.

No.	Driver	Team	Manufacturer
1	Jamie McMurray	Chip Ganassi Racing	Chevrolet
2	Brad Keselowski	Team Penske	Ford
3	Austin Dillon	Richard Childress Racing	Chevrolet
4	Kevin Harvick	Stewart–Haas Racing	Chevrolet
5	Kasey Kahne	Hendrick Motorsports	Chevrolet
6	Trevor Bayne	Roush Fenway Racing	Ford
7	Regan Smith	Tommy Baldwin Racing	Chevrolet
10	Danica Patrick	Stewart–Haas Racing	Chevrolet
11	Denny Hamlin	Joe Gibbs Racing	Toyota
13	Casey Mears	Germain Racing	Chevrolet
14	Tony Stewart	Stewart–Haas Racing	Chevrolet
15	Clint Bowyer	HScott Motorsports	Chevrolet
16	Greg Biffle	Roush Fenway Racing	Ford
17	Ricky Stenhouse Jr.	Roush Fenway Racing	Ford
18	Kyle Busch	Joe Gibbs Racing	Toyota
19	Carl Edwards	Joe Gibbs Racing	Toyota
20	Matt Kenseth	Joe Gibbs Racing	Toyota
21	Ryan Blaney (R)	Wood Brothers Racing	Ford
22	Joey Logano	Team Penske	Ford
23	David Ragan	BK Racing	Toyota
24	Chase Elliott (R)	Hendrick Motorsports	Chevrolet
27	Paul Menard	Richard Childress Racing	Chevrolet
30	Josh Wise	The Motorsports Group	Chevrolet
31	Ryan Newman	Richard Childress Racing	Chevrolet
32	Patrick Carpentier	Go FAS Racing	Ford
34	Chris Buescher (R)	Front Row Motorsports	Ford
38	Landon Cassill	Front Row Motorsports	Ford
41	Kurt Busch	Stewart–Haas Racing	Chevrolet
42	Kyle Larson	Chip Ganassi Racing	Chevrolet
43	Aric Almirola	Richard Petty Motorsports	Ford
44	Brian Scott (R)	Richard Petty Motorsports	Ford
46	Michael Annett	HScott Motorsports	Chevrolet
47	A. J. Allmendinger	JTG Daugherty Racing	Chevrolet
48	Jimmie Johnson	Hendrick Motorsports	Chevrolet
55	Cody Ware (R)	Premium Motorsports	Chevrolet
78	Martin Truex Jr.	Furniture Row Racing	Toyota
83	Matt DiBenedetto	BK Racing	Toyota
88	Dale Earnhardt Jr.	Hendrick Motorsports	Chevrolet
93	Dylan Lupton (R)	BK Racing	Toyota
95	Michael McDowell	Circle Sport – Leavine Family Racing	Chevrolet
98	Cole Whitt	Premium Motorsports	Toyota
Official entry list

== Practice ==
=== First practice ===
Kyle Larson was the fastest in the first practice session with a time of 75.299 and a speed of 95.141 mph (153.115 km/h).

Pos	No.	Driver	Team	Manufacturer	Time	Speed
1	42	Kyle Larson	Chip Ganassi Racing	Chevrolet	75.299	95.141
2	1	Jamie McMurray	Chip Ganassi Racing	Chevrolet	75.774	94.544
3	78	Martin Truex Jr.	Furniture Row Racing	Toyota	75.811	94.498
Official first practice results

=== Final practice ===
Dale Earnhardt Jr. was the fastest in the final practice session with a time of 75.175 and a speed of 95.298 mph (153.367 km/h).

Pos	No.	Driver	Team	Manufacturer	Time	Speed
1	88	Dale Earnhardt Jr.	Hendrick Motorsports	Chevrolet	75.175	95.298
2	13	Casey Mears	Germain Racing	Chevrolet	75.209	95.255
3	11	Denny Hamlin	Joe Gibbs Racing	Toyota	75.218	95.243
Official final practice results

== Qualifying ==
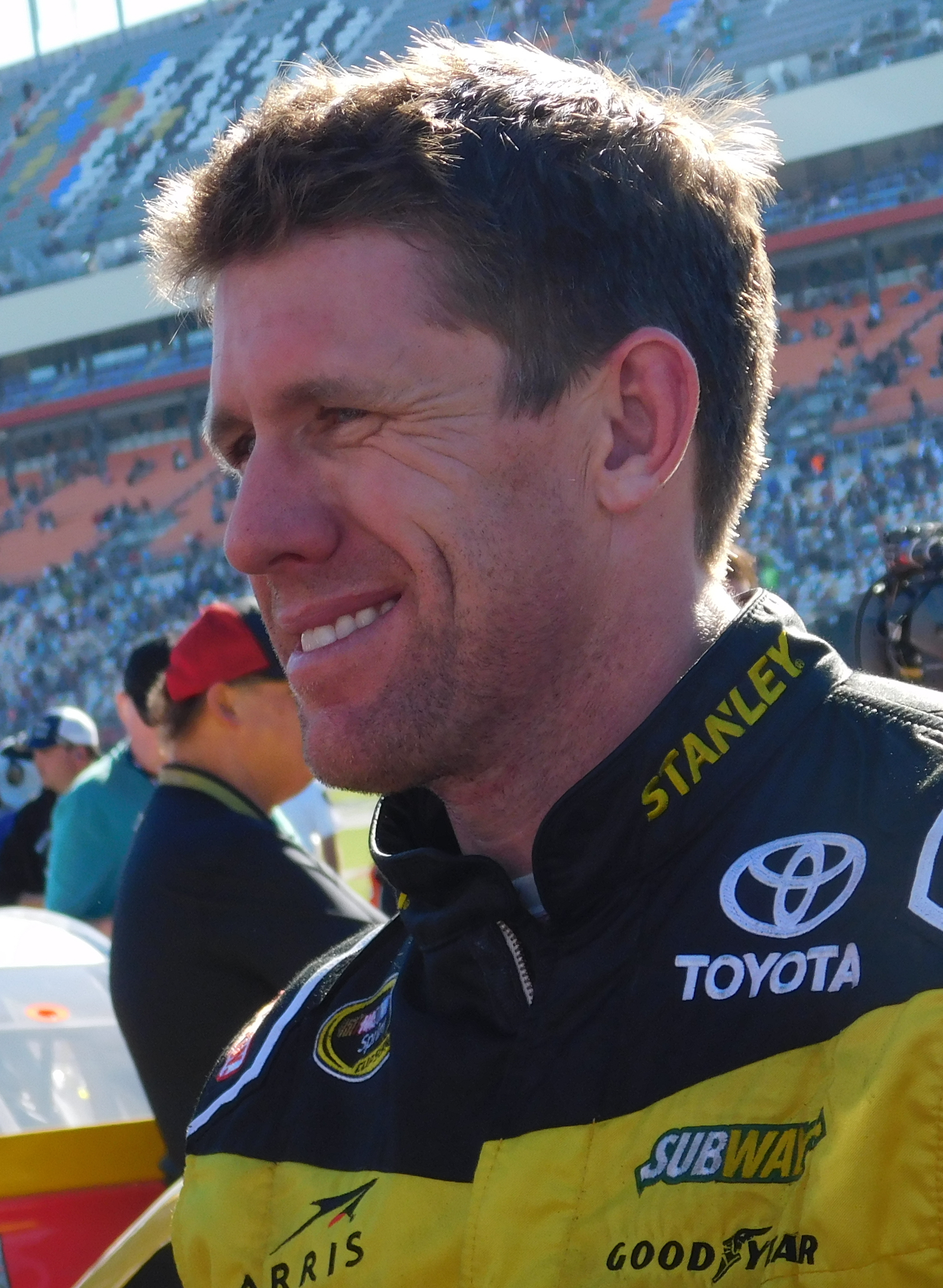
Carl Edwards scored the pole position.

Carl Edwards scored the pole for the race with a time of 1:14.799 and a speed of 95.777 mph (154.138 km/h). He said that his pole lap "was amazing, the car was perfect, and then I wasn’t sure about the second lap. It was good enough, and that tells you how good the car is. I just can’t say enough about Stanley and all the things they’re doing for us. We had dinner last night for us and this will be really exciting for them to have their Stanley Toyota up on the pole for the start of the race, and hopefully we can stay there and get another win.”

A. J. Allmendinger, who qualified second, said when he "saw Carl's first lap, I was like, I don't care what kind of lap I run, I'm never going to catch that. There's no pressure on me. He's won here before (in 2014); my best finish is seventh. We just have to go out and have a solid day." “Definitely a big gain from where we were yesterday,” he added. “We’ve still got to go to work, we’ve still got to figure out race trim, but a good start at least.”

Dylan Lupton qualified 38th in his Sprint Cup Series debut. Cody Ware failed to qualify for the race.

=== Qualifying results ===
Pos	No.	Driver	Team	Manufacturer	R1	R2
1	19	Carl Edwards	Joe Gibbs Racing	Toyota	74.392	74.799
2	47	A. J. Allmendinger	JTG Daugherty Racing	Chevrolet	74.990	74.878
3	78	Martin Truex Jr.	Furniture Row Racing	Toyota	74.763	74.881
4	41	Kurt Busch	Stewart–Haas Racing	Chevrolet	75.018	74.895
5	42	Kyle Larson	Chip Ganassi Racing	Chevrolet	75.121	75.124
6	11	Denny Hamlin	Joe Gibbs Racing	Toyota	75.103	75.167
7	22	Joey Logano	Team Penske	Ford	74.808	75.192
8	18	Kyle Busch	Joe Gibbs Racing	Toyota	74.776	75.226
9	27	Paul Menard	Richard Childress Racing	Chevrolet	74.922	75.304
10	14	Tony Stewart	Stewart–Haas Racing	Chevrolet	74.921	75.378
11	10	Danica Patrick	Stewart–Haas Racing	Chevrolet	75.083	75.383
12	2	Brad Keselowski	Team Penske	Ford	74.980	75.437
13	88	Dale Earnhardt Jr.	Hendrick Motorsports	Chevrolet	75.150	
14	13	Casey Mears	Germain Racing	Chevrolet	75.239	
15	48	Jimmie Johnson	Hendrick Motorsports	Chevrolet	75.389	
16	24	Chase Elliott (R)	Hendrick Motorsports	Chevrolet	75.447	
17	31	Ryan Newman	Richard Childress Racing	Chevrolet	75.485	
18	15	Clint Bowyer	HScott Motorsports	Chevrolet	75.492	
19	5	Kasey Kahne	Hendrick Motorsports	Chevrolet	75.501	
20	95	Michael McDowell	Circle Sport – Leavine Family Racing	Chevrolet	75.556	
21	1	Jamie McMurray	Chip Ganassi Racing	Chevrolet	75.640	
22	44	Brian Scott (R)	Richard Petty Motorsports	Ford	75.646	
23	20	Matt Kenseth	Joe Gibbs Racing	Toyota	75.793	
24	3	Austin Dillon	Richard Childress Racing	Chevrolet	75.809	
25	4	Kevin Harvick	Stewart–Haas Racing	Chevrolet	75.854	
26	21	Ryan Blaney (R)	Wood Brothers Racing	Ford	75.861	
27	17	Ricky Stenhouse Jr.	Roush Fenway Racing	Ford	75.872	
28	6	Trevor Bayne	Roush Fenway Racing	Ford	75.889	
29	43	Aric Almirola	Richard Petty Motorsports	Ford	75.922	
30	23	David Ragan	BK Racing	Toyota	75.925	
31	7	Regan Smith	Tommy Baldwin Racing	Chevrolet	75.994	
32	16	Greg Biffle	Roush Fenway Racing	Ford	76.045	
33	83	Matt DiBenedetto	BK Racing	Toyota	76.088	
34	32	Patrick Carpentier	Go FAS Racing	Ford	76.328	
35	98	Cole Whitt	Premium Motorsports	Toyota	76.483	
36	34	Chris Buescher (R)	Front Row Motorsports	Ford	76.492	
37	38	Landon Cassill	Front Row Motorsports	Ford	76.820	
38	93	Dylan Lupton (R)	BK Racing	Toyota	76.964	
39	30	Josh Wise	The Motorsports Group	Chevrolet	77.010	
40	46	Michael Annett	HScott Motorsports	Chevrolet	77.872	
Did not qualify
41	55	Cody Ware (R)	Premium Motorsports	Chevrolet	78.145	
Official qualifying results

== Race ==
=== First half ===
Under clear blue California skies, Carl Edwards led the field to the green flag at 3:22 p.m. The first caution of the race flew on the seventh lap after Clint Bowyer's car came to a halt in the esses after the wiring in the dashboard caught fire. He said afterwards that the issue was probably "the ignition; it was a wiring fire. I've had oil smoke and stuff like that pour into the car ... I've never had an electrical fire. Damn, it choked me out, I couldn't breathe. I bailed out and the damn thing starts rolling so I had to reach in and put it in gear. That's a great start to the day." He would go on to finish 40th.

The race restarted on lap 8. A. J. Allmendinger passed Edwards climbing up turn 2 to take the lead. After 10 laps, his lead had only grown to close to a second over Edwards. A number of cars started hitting pit road on lap 20. Jamie McMurray was tagged for speeding and was forced to serve a pass through penalty. Allmendinger made his stop on lap 25 and handed the lead to Paul Menard. Kevin Harvick out-braked Menard going into turn 4a to take the lead on lap 28. He pitted on lap 31 and the lead cycled to Edwards.

A number of cars began pitting on lap 45. Debris in turn 1 brought out the second caution of the race on lap 46. Kyle Busch opted to stay out when most of the field pitted and assumed the lead.

=== Second half ===
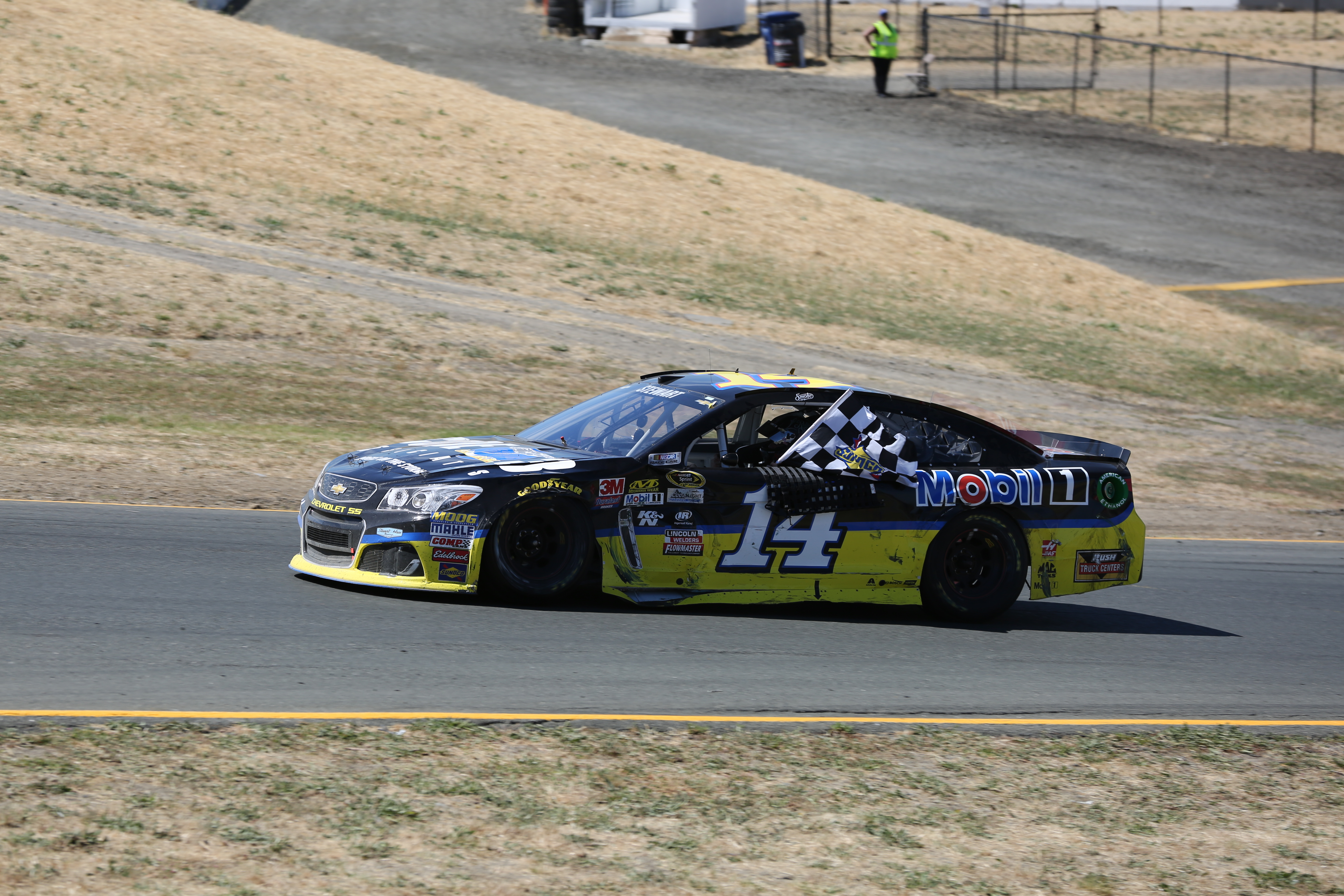
Tony Stewart scored the final win of his Cup Series career.

The race restarted with 61 laps to go. Denny Hamlin drove to the outside of his teammate in the esses to take the lead with 60 laps to go. A number of cars began pitting with 42 laps to go. Kyle Larson was tagged for speeding on pit road and was forced to serve a pass through penalty. Hamlin pitted with 39 laps to go and handed the lead to Allmendinger. Both drivers pitted the next lap and handed the lead to Danica Patrick. Michael McDowell was tagged for an uncontrolled tire and was forced to serve a pass through penalty. Hamlin took back the lead from Patrick passing to her outside at the top of turn 2.

Debris in turn 7a brought out the third caution of the race with 24 laps to go. Tony Stewart opted to stay out when the leaders pitted and assumed the lead. Allmendinger was tagged for an uncontrolled tire and restarted the race from the tail end of the field, to which he sarcastically told his crew "Good job, guys."

The race restarted with 20 laps to go. The fourth caution of the race flew with 18 laps to go after McDowell's car stalled off the track near turn 9.

The race restarted with 14 laps to go. Martin Truex Jr. attempted to out-brake Stewart going into turn 7a with 12 laps to go, but he carried too much speed and had to stay on the brakes longer. This allowed Hamlin to pass him for second. In the remaining laps, Hamlin attempted to run down and pass Stewart to no avail. On the final lap, however, Hamlin out-braked Stewart going into turn 7a and took the lead. At turn 11, he locked the brakes and left the inside line open. Stewart drove his car into the gap, sent Hamlin and himself into the wall and drove on to score the victory.

== Post-race ==
=== Driver comments ===
Stewart said after the race that with "eight to go it was the first time I thought, 'hey, we might actually have a shot to hold onto this,' and I actually got a little bit emotional thinking about it while I was driving," Stewart said. "But you stay so focused and you have to. That was when they got racing each other and there was a bit of a gap and I had a little bit of a breather there to kind of think that once Denny (Hamlin) got closing in, it was back to business. You didn't have time to think about wine and flowers and ponies and all that stuff. I had to get back to business. But it was nice."

Hamlin said afterwards that his "car was the worst it was all day. I didn’t have any forward drive (on turn 11). I didn’t run a low enough line. Once I knew he had position, I knew he wasn’t going to leave it to chance and have a drag race."

== Race results ==
Pos	No.	Driver	Team	Manufacturer	Laps	Pts.
1	14	Tony Stewart	Stewart–Haas Racing	Chevrolet	110	44
2	11	Denny Hamlin	Joe Gibbs Racing	Toyota	110	41
3	22	Joey Logano	Team Penske	Ford	110	38
4	19	Carl Edwards	Joe Gibbs Racing	Toyota	110	38
5	78	Martin Truex Jr.	Furniture Row Racing	Toyota	110	36
6	4	Kevin Harvick	Stewart–Haas Racing	Chevrolet	110	36
7	18	Kyle Busch	Joe Gibbs Racing	Toyota	110	35
8	31	Ryan Newman	Richard Childress Racing	Chevrolet	110	33
9	5	Kasey Kahne	Hendrick Motorsports	Chevrolet	110	32
10	41	Kurt Busch	Stewart–Haas Racing	Chevrolet	110	31
11	88	Dale Earnhardt Jr.	Hendrick Motorsports	Chevrolet	110	30
12	42	Kyle Larson	Chip Ganassi Racing	Chevrolet	110	29
13	48	Jimmie Johnson	Hendrick Motorsports	Chevrolet	110	28
14	47	A. J. Allmendinger	JTG Daugherty Racing	Chevrolet	110	28
15	2	Brad Keselowski	Team Penske	Ford	110	26
16	27	Paul Menard	Richard Childress Racing	Chevrolet	110	26
17	1	Jamie McMurray	Chip Ganassi Racing	Chevrolet	110	24
18	16	Greg Biffle	Roush Fenway Racing	Ford	110	23
19	10	Danica Patrick	Stewart–Haas Racing	Chevrolet	110	23
20	20	Matt Kenseth	Joe Gibbs Racing	Toyota	110	21
21	24	Chase Elliott (R)	Hendrick Motorsports	Chevrolet	110	20
22	3	Austin Dillon	Richard Childress Racing	Chevrolet	110	19
23	21	Ryan Blaney (R)	Wood Brothers Racing	Ford	110	18
24	13	Casey Mears	Germain Racing	Chevrolet	110	17
25	6	Trevor Bayne	Roush Fenway Racing	Ford	110	16
26	17	Ricky Stenhouse Jr.	Roush Fenway Racing	Ford	110	15
27	43	Aric Almirola	Richard Petty Motorsports	Ford	110	14
28	7	Regan Smith	Tommy Baldwin Racing	Chevrolet	110	13
29	38	Landon Cassill	Front Row Motorsports	Ford	110	12
30	34	Chris Buescher (R)	Front Row Motorsports	Ford	110	11
31	83	Matt DiBenedetto	BK Racing	Toyota	110	10
32	23	David Ragan	BK Racing	Toyota	110	9
33	44	Brian Scott (R)	Richard Petty Motorsports	Ford	110	8
34	98	Cole Whitt	Premium Motorsports	Toyota	110	7
35	93	Dylan Lupton (R)	BK Racing	Toyota	110	0
36	46	Michael Annett	HScott Motorsports	Chevrolet	109	5
37	32	Patrick Carpentier	Go FAS Racing	Ford	108	4
38	30	Josh Wise	The Motorsports Group	Chevrolet	97	3
39	95	Michael McDowell	Circle Sport – Leavine Family Racing	Chevrolet	91	2
40	15	Clint Bowyer	HScott Motorsports	Chevrolet	5	1
Official race results

=== Race summary ===
- Lead changes: 12 among different drivers
- Cautions/Laps: 4 for 10
- Red flags: 0
- Time of race: 2 hours, 42 minutes, and 13 seconds
- Average speed: 80.966 miles per hour (130.302 km/h)

== Media ==
=== Television ===
Fox NASCAR televised the race in the United States on FS1 for the second consecutive year. Mike Joy was the lap-by-lap announcer, while six-time Sonoma winner Jeff Gordon and Darrell Waltrip were the color commentators. Jamie Little, Chris Neville and Matt Yocum reported from pit lane during the race.

FS1 Television
Booth announcers	Pit reporters
Lap-by-lap: Mike Joy; Color-commentator: Jeff Gordon; Color commentator: Darrell Waltrip	Jamie Little; Chris Neville; Matt Yocum

=== Radio ===
Radio coverage of the race was broadcast by Performance Racing Network. PRN's broadcast of the race was simulcasted on Sirius XM NASCAR Radio. Doug Rice, Mark Garrow and Wendy Venturini announced the race in the booth while the field was racing on the pit straight. Pat Patterson called the race from a stand outside of turn 2 when the field was racing up turns 2, 3 and 3a. Brad Gillie called the race from a stand outside of turn 7a when the field was racing through turns 4a and 7a. The field came back into the view of the booth in turns 8 and 9. Rob Albright called the race from a billboard outside turn 11 when the field was racing through turns 10 and 11. Heather DeBeaux, Brett McMillan, Jim Noble and Steve Richards reported from pit lane during the race.

PRN
Booth announcers	Turn announcers	Pit reporters
Lead announcer: Doug Rice; Announcer: Mark Garrow; Announcer: Wendy Venturini	Turns 2, 3 & 3a: Pat Patterson; Turns 4a & 7a: Brad Gillie; Turns 10 & 11: Rob Albright	Heather DeBeaux; Brett McMillan; Jim Noble; Steve Richards

== Standings after the race ==
Drivers' Championship standings
	Pos	Manufacturer	Points
	1	Kevin Harvick	562
	2	Kurt Busch	527 (–35)
1	3	Carl Edwards	510 (–52)
1	4	Brad Keselowski	506 (–56)
	5	Joey Logano	493 (–69)
	6	Chase Elliott (R)	473 (–89)
	7	Jimmie Johnson	469 (–93)
	8	Martin Truex Jr.	469 (–93)
	9	Kyle Busch	452 (–110)
	10	Matt Kenseth	430 (–132)
2	11	Denny Hamlin	421 (–141)
1	12	Dale Earnhardt Jr.	413 (–149)
2	13	Ryan Newman	402 (–160)
2	14	Austin Dillon	400 (–162)
1	15	Jamie McMurray	398 (–164)
1	16	Kasey Kahne	385 (–177)
Official driver's standings

Manufacturers' Championship standings
Pos	Manufacturer	Points
1	Toyota	664
2	Chevrolet	650 (–14)
3	Ford	597 (–67)
Official manufacturers' standings

- Note: Only the first 16 positions are included for the driver standings.
  . – Driver has clinched a position in the Chase for the Sprint Cup.

Previous race: 2016 FireKeepers Casino 400	Sprint Cup Series; 2016 season	Next race: 2016 Coke Zero 400
