= Ryan Lynch (racing driver) =

American racing driver (born 1986)

- Born: July 31, 1986 (age 40); New Boston, Texas, U.S.

NASCAR FedEx Freight Truck Series career
- 6 races run over 4 years
- 2016 position: 69th
- Best finish: 52nd (2013)
- First race: 2012 American Ethanol 200 (Iowa)
- Last race: 2016 Rattlesnake 400 (Texas)
Wins	Top tens	Poles
0	0	0

Ryan Lynch (born July 31, 1986) is an American former professional stock car racing driver. He has raced in the NASCAR Camping World Truck Series.

== Racing career ==
Lynch began in kart racing at the age of eight before moving to late models. In 2010, he finished fifth in the United States Super Truck Series standings.

In 2011, Lynch tested with the ARCA Racing Series at Daytona International Speedway and made his NASCAR K&N Pro Series East debut at South Boston Speedway. He also ran the ARCA race at Salem Speedway, where he finished 13th. A year later, he began racing in the NASCAR Camping World Truck Series with the support of former NASCAR driver Rick Crawford. Between 2012 and 2016, he ran six Truck races with a best run of 22nd at Texas Motor Speedway in 2014.

== Personal life ==
Lynch graduated from Texarkana College and the University of Texas at Tyler.

== Motorsports career results ==
=== NASCAR ===
(key) (Bold – Pole position awarded by qualifying time. Italics – Pole position earned by points standings or practice time. * – Most laps led.)

==== Camping World Truck Series ====
NASCAR Camping World Truck Series results
Year	Team	No.	Make	1	2	3	4	5	6	7	8	9	10	11	12	13	14	15	16	17	18	19	20	21	22	23	NCWTC	Pts	Ref
2012	Hillman Racing	27	Chevy	DAY	MAR	CAR	KAN	CLT	DOV	TEX	KEN	IOW	CHI	POC	MCH	BRI	ATL	IOW; 29	KEN	LVS	TAL	MAR	TEX	PHO			60th	29	
2012	RSS Racing	93	Chevy																						HOM; 30		60th	29	
2013	RSS Racing	39	Chevy	DAY	MAR	CAR	KAN	CLT	DOV	TEX	KEN; 24	IOW	ELD	POC	MCH	BRI	MSP	IOW	CHI	LVS	TAL	MAR	TEX; 25	PHO	HOM		52nd	39	
2014	SS-Green Light Racing	07	Chevy	DAY	MAR	KAN	CLT	DOV	TEX	GTW	KEN	IOW	ELD	POC	MCH	BRI	MSP	CHI	NHA	LVS	TAL	MAR	TEX; 22	PHO	HOM		72nd	22	
2016	SS-Green Light Racing	07	Chevy	DAY	ATL	MAR	KAN	DOV	CLT	TEX; 26	IOW	GTW	KEN	ELD	POC	BRI	MCH	MSP	CHI	NHA	LVS	TAL	MAR	TEX	PHO	HOM	69th	7	

==== K&N Pro Series East ====
NASCAR K&N Pro Series East results
Year	Team	No.	Make	1	2	3	4	5	6	7	8	9	10	11	12	NKNPSEC	Pts	Ref
2011	Spraker Racing Enterprises	37	Chevy	GRE	SBO; 16	RCH										48th	182	
2011	Spraker Racing Enterprises	08	Chevy				IOW; DNQ	BGS	JFC	LGY	NHA	COL	GRE	NHA	DOV	48th	182	

=== ARCA Racing Series ===
(key) (Bold – Pole position awarded by qualifying time. Italics – Pole position earned by points standings or practice time. * – Most laps led.)

ARCA Racing Series results
Year	Team	No.	Make	1	2	3	4	5	6	7	8	9	10	11	12	13	14	15	16	17	18	19	ARSC	Pts	Ref
2011	Cunningham Motorsports	22	Dodge	DAY	TAL	SLM	TOL	NJE	CHI	POC	MCH	WIN	BLN	IOW	IRP	POC	ISF	MAD	DSF	SLM; 13	KAN	TOL	108th	165	
