= Robert Bruce (racing driver) =

American racing driver (1967–2025)

- Born: June 4, 1967; Fredericksburg, Virginia, U.S.
- Died: July 1, 2025 (aged 58)

NASCAR FedEx Freight Truck Series career
- 1 race run over 2 years
- Best finish: 74th (2013)
- First race: 2013 Kroger 250 (Martinsville)
Wins	Top tens	Poles
0	0	0

ARCA Menards Series career
- 2 races run over 2 years
- Best finish: 91st (2018)
- First race: 2017 Shore Lunch 250 (Elko)
- Last race: 2018 Sioux Chief PowerPEX 250 (Elko)
Wins	Top tens	Poles
0	1	0
- Statistics up to date as of December 11, 2024.

Robert Bruce (June 4, 1967 – July 1, 2025) was an American professional stock car racing driver and crew chief who competed in the NASCAR Camping World Truck Series and the ARCA Racing Series.

Bruce also competed in series such as the now defunct NASCAR Goody's Dash Series, the IPOWER Dash Series, and the ISCARS Dash Touring Series.

Bruce died on July 1, 2025, at the age of 58.

== Motorsports results ==
=== NASCAR ===
(key) (Bold - Pole position awarded by qualifying time. Italics - Pole position earned by points standings or practice time. * – Most laps led.)

==== Camping World Truck Series ====
NASCAR Camping World Truck Series results
Year	Team	No.	Make	1	2	3	4	5	6	7	8	9	10	11	12	13	14	15	16	17	18	19	20	21	22	23	24	25	NCWTC	Pts	Ref
2008	Derrike Cope Inc.	73	Dodge	DAY	CAL	ATL	MAR	KAN	CLT	MFD	DOV	TEX	MCH	MLW	MEM	KEN	IRP	NSH	BRI	GTW	NHA	LVS	TAL	MAR; DNQ	ATL	TEX	PHO	HOM	N/A	0	
2013	Mike Harmon Racing	84	Ford	DAY	MAR; 28	CAR	KAN	CLT	DOV	TEX	KEN	IOW	ELD	POC	MCH	BRI	MSP	IOW	CHI	LVS	TAL	MAR	TEX	PHO	HOM				74th	16	

==== Goody's Dash Series ====
NASCAR Goody's Dash Series results
Year	Team	No.	Make	1	2	3	4	5	6	7	8	9	10	11	12	13	14	NGDS	Pts	Ref
2002	N/A	8	Pontiac	DAY	HAR	ROU	LON	CLT	KEN	MEM	GRE	SNM	SBO	MYB	BRI	MOT	ATL; DNQ	77th	85	
2003	N/A	8	Pontiac	DAY	OGL	CLT	SBO; 24	GRE; 16										27th	418	
2003	N/A	99	Pontiac						KEN; 19	BRI; 19	ATL							27th	418	

=== ARCA Racing Series ===
(key) (Bold – Pole position awarded by qualifying time. Italics – Pole position earned by points standings or practice time. * – Most laps led. ** – All laps led.)

ARCA Racing Series results
Year	Team	No.	Make	1	2	3	4	5	6	7	8	9	10	11	12	13	14	15	16	17	18	19	20	ARSC	Pts	Ref
2017	Mullins Racing	28	Ford	DAY	NSH	SLM	TAL	TOL	ELK; 12	POC	MCH	MAD	IOW	IRP	POC	WIN	ISF	ROA	DSF	SLM	CHI	KEN	KAN	93rd	170	
2018	Mullins Racing	2	Ford	DAY	NSH	SLM	TAL	TOL	CLT	POC	MCH	MAD	GTW	CHI	IOW	ELK; 10	POC	ISF	BLN	DSF	SLM	IRP	KAN	91st	155	
