= Clay Greenfield =

American racing driver (born 1984)

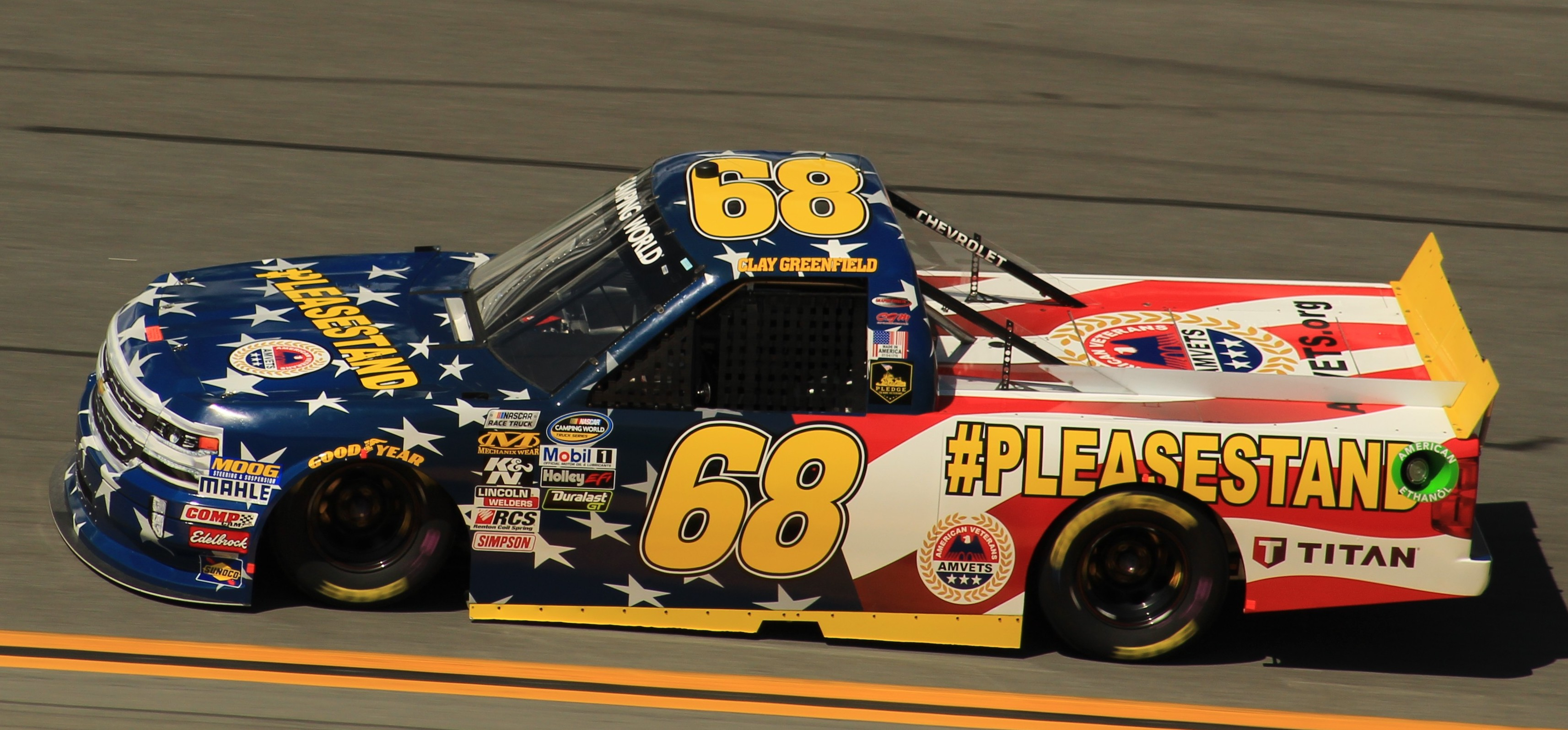
- Greenfield racing at Daytona in 2018
- Born: Clayton Michael Greenfield; June 3, 1984 (age 42); Clarksville, Tennessee, U.S.

NASCAR O'Reilly Auto Parts Series career
- 1 race run over 1 year
- 2014 position: 121st
- Best finish: 121st (2014)
- First race: 2011 Great Clips 300 (Atlanta)
Wins	Top tens	Poles
0	0	0

NASCAR FedEx Freight Truck Series career
- 75 races run over 17 years
- Truck no., team: No. 95 (GK Racing)
- 2026 position: 50th
- Best finish: 22nd (2020)
- First race: 2010 Kroger 250 (Martinsville)
- Last race: 2026 Love's RV Stop 225 (Talladega)
Wins	Top tens	Poles
0	2	0

ARCA Menards Series career
- 3 races run over 3 years
- Best finish: 76th (2020)
- First race: 2004 Eddie Gilstrap Motors 200 (Salem)
- Last race: 2020 General Tire AnywhereIsPossible 200 (Pocono)
Wins	Top tens	Poles
0	1	0
- Statistics up to date as of November 6, 2026.

Clayton Michael Greenfield (born June 3, 1984) is an American professional stock car racing driver and team owner. He currently competes part-time in the NASCAR Truck Series, driving the No. 95 Chevrolet Silverado RST for GK Racing.

== Racing career ==
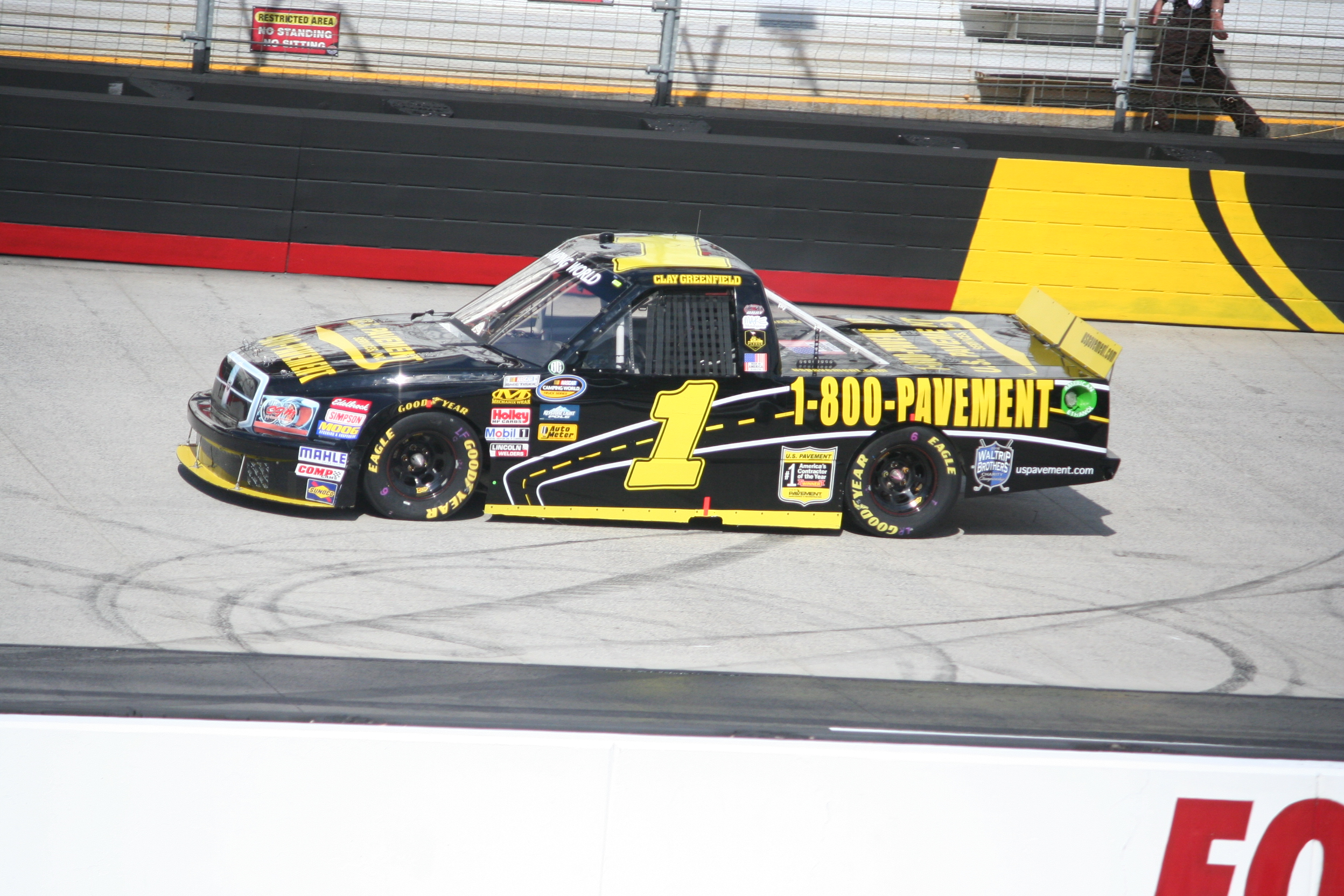
Greenfield competing at Bristol in 2016

A graduate of Clarksville Academy, early in his career Greenfield competed primarily in the UARA-Stars Series, also making several qualifying attempts in the ARCA Racing Series in the mid-2000s, his debut being at Salem Speedway in 2004; driving for Wayne Peterson Racing, he finished twelfth to score the team's best race finish since 1998. Greenfield made his debut in NASCAR competition in 2010, driving for Team Gill Racing in the Camping World Truck Series at Martinsville Speedway. Over the next three years, he competed in 22 races, posting a best finish of tenth at Daytona International Speedway in 2012. Greenfield also made his debut in the Nationwide Series in 2011, finishing 35th at Atlanta Motor Speedway, driving the No. 71 for Rick Ware Racing.

Greenfield began the 2013 season by posting the fastest time in practice for the Truck Series' season-opening event at Daytona International Speedway in February, and finished 26th in the race, but then failed to qualify for the next two races. He finished sixteenth at Kansas Speedway, then returned to the series at Kentucky Speedway in July, finishing 35th for Norm Benning Racing. A few weeks later, he and Norm Benning were surprisingly racing against each other for a final transfer spot in the Mudsummer Classic race yet lost it to his part-time owner. Greenfield has not driven for Benning since.

In 2020, Greenfield returned to the Truck Series to run a part-time schedule, which was then the full season excluding Las Vegas, Daytona RC, and Phoenix, and also made his first ARCA start since 2015, where he drove Andy Hillenburg's No. 11 car at Pocono. Greenfield had a new crew chief for his Truck Series team starting that year, as he was able to get Fox NASCAR commentator and two-time Cup Series champion crew chief Jeff Hammond to come out of retirement and crew chief his No. 68 in the races it was entered in.

In 2021, Greenfield was due to run the full season with him running for three races due to sponsorship. Greenfield ultimately failed to qualify at Daytona, Nashville, and Gateway. He did qualify for Darlington for an impressive nineteenth place finish. Greenfield then joined Spencer Davis Motorsports for the UNOH 200.

== Motorsports career results ==
=== Stock car career summary ===
Season	Series	Team	Races	Wins	Top 5	Top 10	Points	Position
2004	ARCA Re/Max Series	Wayne Peterson Racing	1	0	0	0	170	127th
2005	ARCA Re/Max Series	Jimmy White Racing	0	0	0	0	0	N/A
2005	ARCA Re/Max Series	Wayne Peterson Racing	0	0	0	0	0	N/A
2006	ARCA Re/Max Series	GIC–Mixon Motorsports	0	0	0	0	0	N/A
2007	ARCA Re/Max Series	Day Enterprise Racing	0	0	0	0	0	N/A
2010	NASCAR Camping World Truck Series	Team Gill Racing	7	0	0	0	716	39th
2010	NASCAR Camping World Truck Series	Rick Ware Racing	1	0	0	0	716	39th
2011	NASCAR Camping World Truck Series	Alger Motorsports	4	0	0	0	50	55th
2011	NASCAR Camping World Truck Series	Sontaag Racing	1	0	0	0	50	55th
2011	NASCAR Camping World Truck Series	RSS Racing	0	0	0	0	50	55th
2011	NASCAR Nationwide Series	Rick Ware Racing	1	0	0	0	0	NC†
2012	NASCAR Camping World Truck Series	Alger Motorsports	8	0	0	1	164	34th
2012	NASCAR Camping World Truck Series	Rick Lind Racing	1	0	0	0	164	34th
2013	NASCAR Camping World Truck Series	Clay Greenfield Motorsports	5	0	0	0	87	38th
2013	NASCAR Camping World Truck Series	Norm Benning Racing	1	0	0	0	87	38th
2014	NASCAR Camping World Truck Series	Clay Greenfield Motorsports	2	0	0	0	37	59th
2014	NASCAR Nationwide Series	Martins Motorsports	0	0	0	0	0	NC†
2015	ARCA Racing Series	Venturini Motorsports	1	0	0	1	190	91st
2015	NASCAR Camping World Truck Series	Clay Greenfield Motorsports	2	0	0	0	39	55th
2016	NASCAR Camping World Truck Series	Clay Greenfield Motorsports	0	0	0	0	0	112th
2016	NASCAR Camping World Truck Series	Jennifer Jo Cobb Racing	0	0	0	0	0	112th
2017	NASCAR Camping World Truck Series	Clay Greenfield Motorsports	4	0	0	1	61	37th
2018	NASCAR Camping World Truck Series	Clay Greenfield Motorsports	5	0	0	0	86	38th
2018	NASCAR Camping World Truck Series	TJL Motorsports	1	0	0	0	86	38th
2019	NASCAR Gander Outdoors Truck Series	Clay Greenfield Motorsports	4	0	0	0	73	40th
2020	ARCA Menards Series	Fast Track Racing	1	0	0	0	28	76th
2020	NASCAR Gander RV & Outdoors Truck Series	Clay Greenfield Motorsports	19	0	0	0	233	22nd
2021	NASCAR Camping World Truck Series	Clay Greenfield Motorsports	1	0	0	0	46	49th
2021	NASCAR Camping World Truck Series	Spencer Davis Motorsports	2	0	0	0	46	49th
2022	NASCAR Camping World Truck Series	Cook Racing Technologies	1	0	0	0	25	51st
2023	NASCAR Craftsman Truck Series	Cook Racing Technologies	1	0	0	0	5	77th
2023	NASCAR Craftsman Truck Series	GK Racing	1	0	0	0	5	77th
2024	NASCAR Craftsman Truck Series	GK Racing	1	0	0	0	22	52nd
2025	NASCAR Craftsman Truck Series	GK Racing	1	0	0	0	4	72nd
2026	NASCAR Craftsman Truck Series	GK Racing	2	0	0	0	41	50th

^{†} As Greenfield was a guest driver, he was ineligible for championship points.

=== NASCAR ===
(key) (Bold – Pole position awarded by qualifying time. Italics – Pole position earned by points standings or practice time. * – Most laps led.)

==== Nationwide Series ====
NASCAR Nationwide Series results
Year	Team	No.	Make	1	2	3	4	5	6	7	8	9	10	11	12	13	14	15	16	17	18	19	20	21	22	23	24	25	26	27	28	29	30	31	32	33	34	NNSC	Pts	Ref
2011	Rick Ware Racing	71	Ford	DAY	PHO	LVS	BRI	CAL	TEX	TAL	NSH	RCH	DAR	DOV	IOW	CLT	CHI	MCH	ROA	DAY	KEN	NHA	NSH	IRP	IOW	GLN	CGV	BRI	ATL; 35	RCH	CHI	DOV	KAN	CLT	TEX	PHO	HOM	132nd	0^{1}	
2014	Martins Motorsports	67	Dodge	DAY; DNQ	PHO	LVS	BRI	CAL	TEX	DAR	RCH	TAL	IOW	CLT	DOV	MCH	ROA	KEN	DAY	NHA	CHI	IND	IOW	GLN	MOH	BRI	ATL	RCH	CHI	KEN	DOV	KAN	CLT	TEX	PHO	HOM		121st	0^{1}	

==== Craftsman Truck Series ====
NASCAR Craftsman Truck Series results
Year	Team	No.	Make	1	2	3	4	5	6	7	8	9	10	11	12	13	14	15	16	17	18	19	20	21	22	23	24	25	NCTC	Pts	Ref
2010	Team Gill Racing	46	Dodge	DAY	ATL	MAR; 21	NSH	KAN	DOV	CLT	TEX	MCH	IOW; 34	GTY; 28	IRP	POC	NSH; 23	DAR			KEN; 24	NHA	LVS; 23	MAR; 27	TAL	TEX	PHO	HOM	39th	716	
2010	Rick Ware Racing	6	Chevy																BRI; 16	CHI									39th	716	
2011	Alger Motorsports	68	Dodge	DAY; DNQ	PHO	DAR	MAR	NSH	DOV	CLT	KAN	TEX; 27	KEN; DNQ	IOW									KEN; 30	LVS	TAL; DNQ	MAR	TEX; 22	HOM; 30	55th	50	
2011	Sonntag Racing	73	Chevy												NSH; 30	IRP	POC	MCH	BRI										55th	50	
2011	RSS Racing	27	Chevy																	ATL; DNQ	CHI	NHA							55th	50	
2012	Alger Motorsports	68	Ram	DAY; 10	MAR; 31	CAR; DNQ	KAN	CLT; 36	DOV	TEX	KEN; 18	IOW	CHI; 28	POC	MCH	BRI; DNQ					TAL; 16	MAR; 25	TEX	PHO	HOM				34th	164	
2012	Alger Motorsports	86	Ram													BRI; 34	ATL	IOW	KEN										34th	164	
2012	Rick Lind Racing	00	Ford																	LVS; 34									34th	164	
2013	Clay Greenfield Motorsports	68	Ram	DAY; 26	MAR; DNQ	CAR; DNQ	KAN; 16	CLT	DOV	TEX			ELD; DNQ	POC	MCH	BRI; 34	MSP	IOW	CHI	LVS	TAL; 13	MAR; 27	TEX	PHO	HOM				38th	87	
2013	Norm Benning Racing	75	Chevy								KEN; 35	IOW																	38th	87	
2014	Clay Greenfield Motorsports	68	Ram	DAY	MAR; 30	KAN	CLT	DOV	TEX	GTW	KEN	IOW	ELD	POC	MCH	BRI	MSP	CHI	NHA	LVS									59th	37	
2014	Clay Greenfield Motorsports	68	Chevy																		TAL; 21	MAR	TEX	PHO	HOM				59th	37	
2015	Clay Greenfield Motorsports	68	Chevy	DAY; DNQ	ATL	MAR	KAN	CLT	DOV	TEX	GTW	IOW	KEN	ELD	POC	MCH	BRI	MSP	CHI	NHA; 19	LVS	TAL; 30	MAR	TEX	PHO	HOM			55th	39	
2016	Clay Greenfield Motorsports	68	Chevy	DAY; DNQ	ATL	MAR	KAN	DOV	CLT	TEX	IOW	GTW	KEN	ELD	POC														112th	–	
2016	Jennifer Jo Cobb Racing	1	Ram													BRI; DNQ	MCH	MSP	CHI	NHA	LVS								112th	–	
2016	Jennifer Jo Cobb Racing	10	Chevy																			TAL; DNQ	MAR	TEX	PHO	HOM			112th	–	
2017	Clay Greenfield Motorsports	68	Chevy	DAY; 29	ATL	MAR	KAN	CLT	DOV	TEX	GTW; 24	IOW	KEN	ELD	POC	MCH	BRI; 26	MSP	CHI	NHA	LVS	TAL; 8	MAR	TEX	PHO	HOM			37th	61	
2018	Clay Greenfield Motorsports	68	Chevy	DAY; 22						CLT; Wth	TEX; 20	IOW	GTW	CHI	KEN; 21	ELD	POC	MCH	BRI; 20	MSP	LVS	TAL; 32	MAR	TEX	PHO	HOM			38th	86	
2018	TJL Motorsports	1	Chevy		ATL; 28	LVS	MAR	DOV	KAN																				38th	86	
2019	Clay Greenfield Motorsports	68	Chevy	DAY; 12	ATL	LVS	MAR	TEX	DOV	KAN	CLT	TEX	IOW	GTW	CHI														40th	73	
2019	Clay Greenfield Motorsports	68	Toyota													KEN; 16	POC	ELD	MCH	BRI; 26	MSP	LVS	TAL; 25	MAR	PHO	HOM			40th	73	
2020	Clay Greenfield Motorsports	68	Toyota	DAY; DNQ	LVS	CLT; 29	ATL; 26	HOM; 30	POC; 31	KEN; 26	TEX; 20	KAN; 28	KAN; 31	MCH; 20	DRC	DOV; 32	GTW; 19	DAR; 21	RCH; 21	BRI; 22	LVS; 22	TAL; 14	KAN; 25	TEX; 35	MAR; 21	PHO			22nd	233	
2021	Clay Greenfield Motorsports	68	Toyota	DAY; DNQ	DRC	LVS	ATL	BRD	RCH	KAN	DAR	COA	CLT	TEX	NSH; DNQ	POC	KNX	GLN	GTW; DNQ	DAR; 19									49th	46	
2021	Spencer Davis Motorsports	11	Toyota																		BRI; 23	LVS	TAL; 23	MAR	PHO				49th	46	
2022	Cook Racing Technologies	84	Toyota	DAY; DNQ	LVS	ATL	COA	MAR	BRD	DAR	KAN	TEX	CLT	GTW	SON	KNX	NSH; DNQ	MOH	POC	IRP	RCH	KAN	BRI	TAL; 12	HOM; DNQ	PHO			51st	25	
2023	Cook Racing Technologies	84	Toyota	DAY; 34	LVS	ATL	COA	TEX	BRD	MAR	KAN	DAR	NWS	CLT															77th	5	
2023	GK Racing	95	Toyota												GTW; 35	NSH	MOH	POC	RCH	IRP	MLW	KAN	BRI						77th	5	
2023	GK Racing	95	Chevy																					TAL; DNQ	HOM	PHO			77th	5	
2024	GK Racing	95	Chevy	DAY; DNQ	ATL	LVS	BRI	COA	MAR	TEX	KAN	DAR	NWS	CLT	GTW	NSH	POC	IRP	RCH	MLW	BRI	KAN	TAL; 15	HOM	MAR	PHO			52nd	22	
2025	GK Racing	95	Chevy	DAY; 33	ATL	LVS	HOM	MAR	BRI	ROC	TEX	KAN	NWS	CLT	NSH	MCH	POC	LRP	IRP	GLN	RCH	DAR	BRI; DNQ	NHA	ROV	TAL	MAR	PHO	72nd	4	
2026	GK Racing	95	Chevy	DAY; 18	ATL	STP	DAR	ROC	BRI	TEX	GLN	DOV	CLT	NSS	MCH	COR	LRP	NWS	IRP	RCH	NHA	BRI	KAN	CLT	PHO	TAL; 15	MAR	HOM	50th	41	

^{*} Season still in progress
^{1} Ineligible for series points

=== ARCA Menards Series ===
(key) (Bold – Pole position awarded by qualifying time. Italics – Pole position earned by points standings or practice time. * – Most laps led.)

ARCA Menards Series results
Year	Team	No.	Make	1	2	3	4	5	6	7	8	9	10	11	12	13	14	15	16	17	18	19	20	21	22	23	AMSC	Pts	Ref
2004	Wayne Peterson Racing	6	Chevy	DAY	NSH	SLM	KEN	TOL	CLT	KAN	POC	MCH	SBO	BLN	KEN	GTW	POC	LER	NSH	ISF	TOL	DSF	CHI	SLM; 12	TAL		127th	170	
2005	Jimmy White Racing	40	Dodge	DAY	NSH; DNQ	SLM	KEN	TOL	LAN	MIL	POC	MCH	KAN	KEN	BLN	POC	GTW	LER	NSH	MCH	ISF	TOL	DSF				N/A	–	
2005	Wayne Peterson Racing	09	Pontiac																					CHI; DNQ		TAL; DNQ	N/A	–	
2005	Wayne Peterson Racing	6	Pontiac																						SLM; DNQ		N/A	–	
2006	GIC–Mixon Motorsports	09	Chevy	DAY; DNQ	NSH	SLM	WIN	KEN	TOL	POC	MCH	KAN	KEN	BLN	POC	GTW	NSH	MCH	ISF	MIL	TOL	DSF	CHI	SLM	TAL	IOW	N/A	–	
2007	Day Enterprise Racing	14	Chevy	DAY	USA	NSH	SLM	KAN	WIN	KEN	TOL	IOW	POC	MCH	BLN	KEN	POC	NSH; DNQ	ISF	MIL	GTW	DSF	CHI	SLM	TAL	TOL	N/A	–	
2015	Venturini Motorsports	55	Toyota	DAY	MOB	NSH; 8	SLM	TAL	TOL	NJE	POC	MCH	CHI	WIN	IOW	IRP	POC	BLN	ISF	DSF	SLM	KEN	KAN				91st	190	
2020	Fast Track Racing	11	Ford	DAY	PHO	TAL	POC; 16	IRP	KEN	IOW	KAN	TOL	TOL	MCH	DRC	GTW	I44	TOL	BRI	WIN	MEM	ISF	KAN				76th	28	
