= Jared Landers =

American racing driver (born 1982)

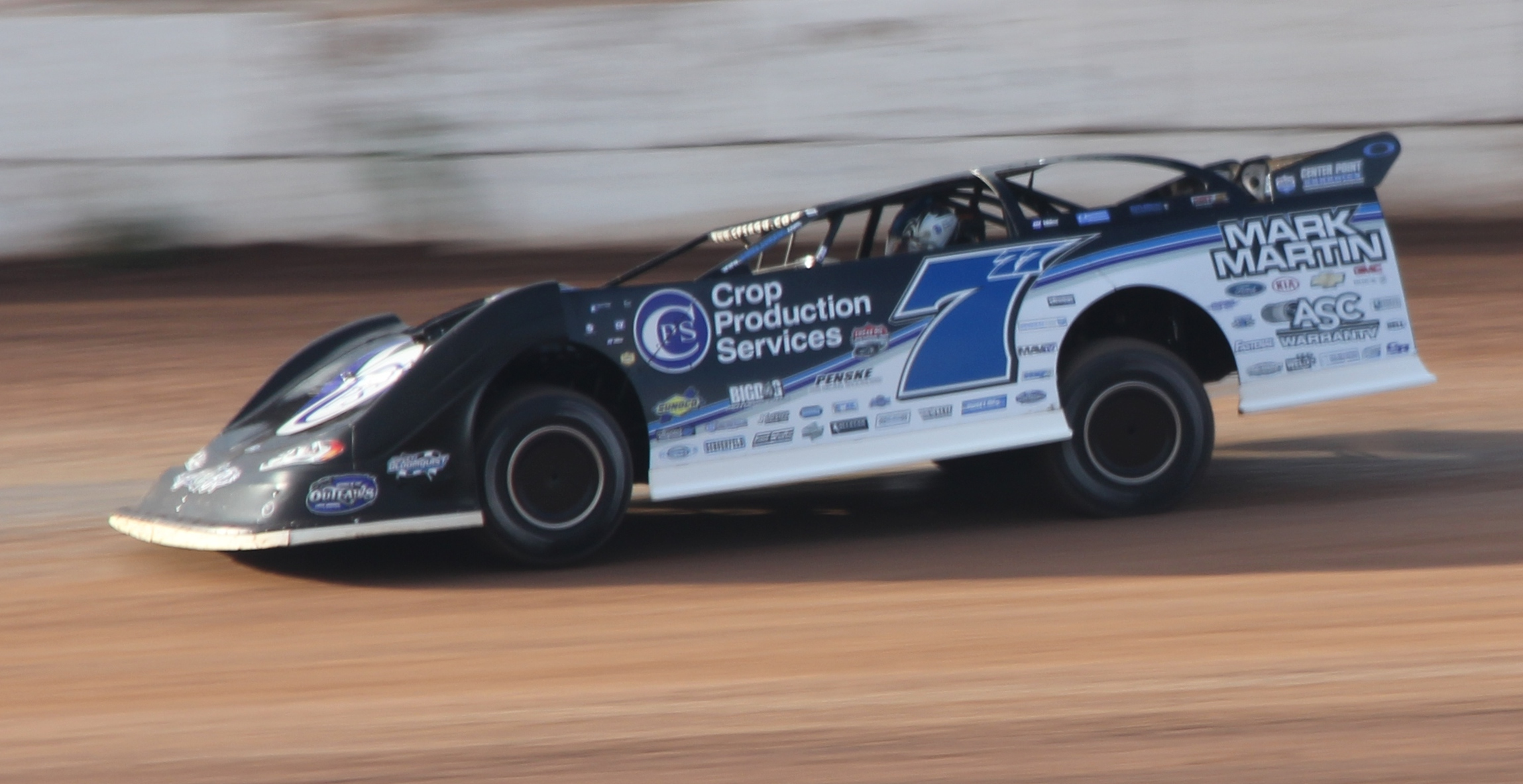
- Landers' Lucas Oil Late Model Dirt Series car at the Oshkosh Speedzone in 2015
- Born: May 1, 1982 (age 44) Batesville, Arkansas, U.S.

Lucas Oil Late Model Dirt Series career
- Current team: Double L Motorsports
- Car number: 777
- Engine: Durham Racing Engines
- Crew chief: Jason Durham

NASCAR FedEx Freight Truck Series career
- 1 race run over 1 year
- Best finish: 54th (2013)
- First race: 2013 Mudsummer Classic (Eldora)
Wins	Top tens	Poles
0	0	0

Jared Landers (born May 1, 1982) is an American professional dirt and stock car racing driver. He currently competes in the Lucas Oil Late Model Dirt Series, driving the No. 777 car for Double L Motorsports.

== Racing career ==
Landers started racing when his father, a former racer, opened a car sales business. The business sponsored sprint car racer Tim Crawley, who built Landers a dirt go-kart. Landers stopped driving when he became an assistant of Crawley and Terrell Chastain, whom Landers' father's business also sponsored. When he turned 17, Landers returned to racing, driving a modified at Batesville Motor Speedway. open-wheel modifieds, Landers has over 100 wins in the discipline.

Landers later moved from Batesville, Arkansas to Welcome, North Carolina. In North Carolina, he became friends with NASCAR driver Clint Bowyer, who invited him to drive for his late model team. Landers also connected with NASCAR drivers Austin and Ty Dillon, building the brothers a dirt modified.

In 2011, Landers started competing in the Lucas Oil Late Model Dirt Series, winning Rookie of the Year.

In 2013, Landers made his NASCAR debut in the Mudsummer Classic at Eldora Speedway, NASCAR's first dirt track race since 1970. While racing for Bowyer, Landers met former NASCAR driver Mark Martin, who assisted him in adjusting to a stock car for the Mudsummer Classic. Landers won his heat race after holding off Matt Crafton for the win; after starting second in the feature, he finished 12th. Landers later attempted the 2014 Mudsummer Classic but withdrew from the event.

Landers departed Clint Bowyer Racing after the 2014 season and moved back to Arkansas. However, he and Martin remained close and the two co-owned a team with Mark Martin Automotive sponsoring the cars. In 2015, the team hired Scott Bloomquist, who recorded over 550 feature victories, as Landers' teammate.

In July 2016, Landers was competing at Tri-City Speedway when his car flipped; the wreck tore his common carotid artery in his neck. He continued to race until it was discovered in mid-August.

== Motorsports career results ==
=== NASCAR ===
(key) (Bold – Pole position awarded by qualifying time. Italics – Pole position earned by points standings or practice time. * – Most laps led.)

==== Camping World Truck Series ====
NASCAR Camping World Truck Series results
Year	Team	No.	Make	1	2	3	4	5	6	7	8	9	10	11	12	13	14	15	16	17	18	19	20	21	22	NCWTC	Pts	Ref
2013	Eddie Sharp Racing	6	Chevy	DAY	MAR	CAR	KAN	CLT	DOV	TEX	KEN	IOW	ELD; 12	POC	MCH	BRI	MSP	IOW	CHI	LVS	TAL	MAR	TEX	PHO	HOM	54th	32	
2014	SS-Green Light Racing	07	Chevy	DAY	MAR	KAN	CLT	DOV	TEX	GTW	KEN	IOW	ELD; DNQ	POC	MCH	BRI	MSP	CHI	NHA	LVS	TAL	MAR	TEX	PHO	HOM	112th	-	
