= Jeff Babcock =

American racing driver (b. 1980)

- Born: March 7, 1980 (age 46); Wayne, Ohio, U.S.

NASCAR FedEx Freight Truck Series career
- 1 race run over 1 year
- 2013 position: 78th
- Best finish: 78th (2013)
- First race: 2013 Mudsummer Classic (Eldora)
Wins	Top tens	Poles
0	0	0

Jeff Babcock (born March 7, 1980) is an American professional stock car racing driver. He last competed part-time in the NASCAR Camping World Truck Series, driving the No. 84 for Best Performance Motorsports.

== Motorsports career results ==
=== NASCAR ===
(key) (Bold – Pole position awarded by qualifying time. Italics – Pole position earned by points standings or practice time. * – Most laps led.)

==== Camping World Truck Series ====
NASCAR Camping World Truck Series results
Year	Team	No.	Make	1	2	3	4	5	6	7	8	9	10	11	12	13	14	15	16	17	18	19	20	21	22	NCWTC	Pts	Ref
2013	Best Performance Motorsports	84	Chevy	DAY	MAR	CAR	KAN	CLT	DOV	TEX	KEN	IOW	ELD; 30	POC	MCH	BRI	MSP	IOW	CHI	LVS	TAL	MAR	TEX	PHO	HOM	78th	14	
