= 2013 NASCAR Camping World Truck Series =

American motorsport season

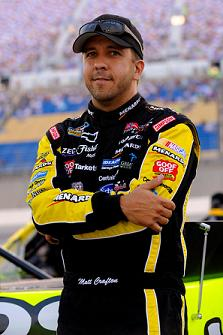
Matt Crafton, the 2013 Camping World Truck Series champion.

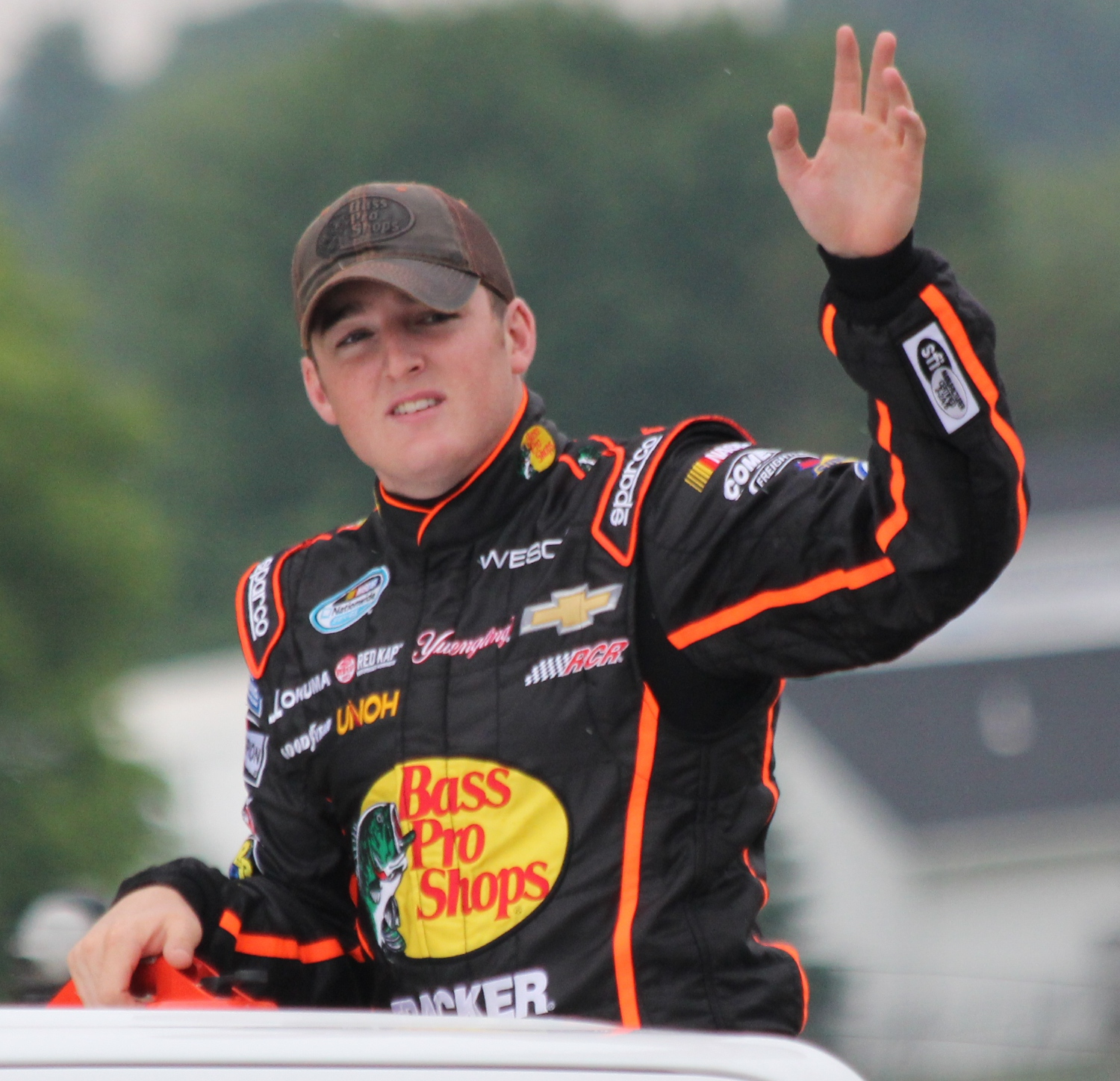
Ty Dillon, shown here in 2014, finished second, 40 points behind Crafton

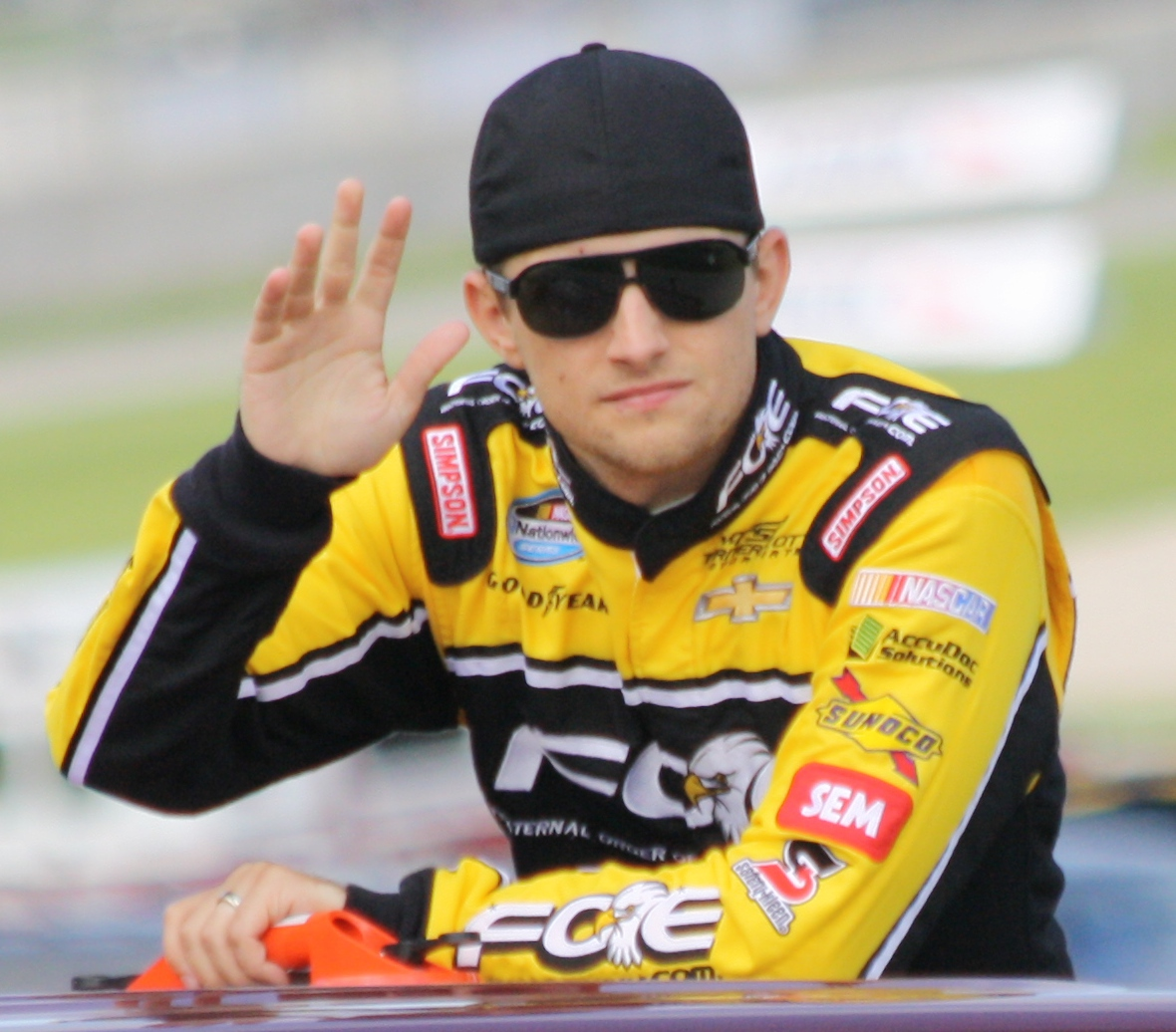
Defending series champion James Buescher finished third in the championship, 43 points behind Crafton.

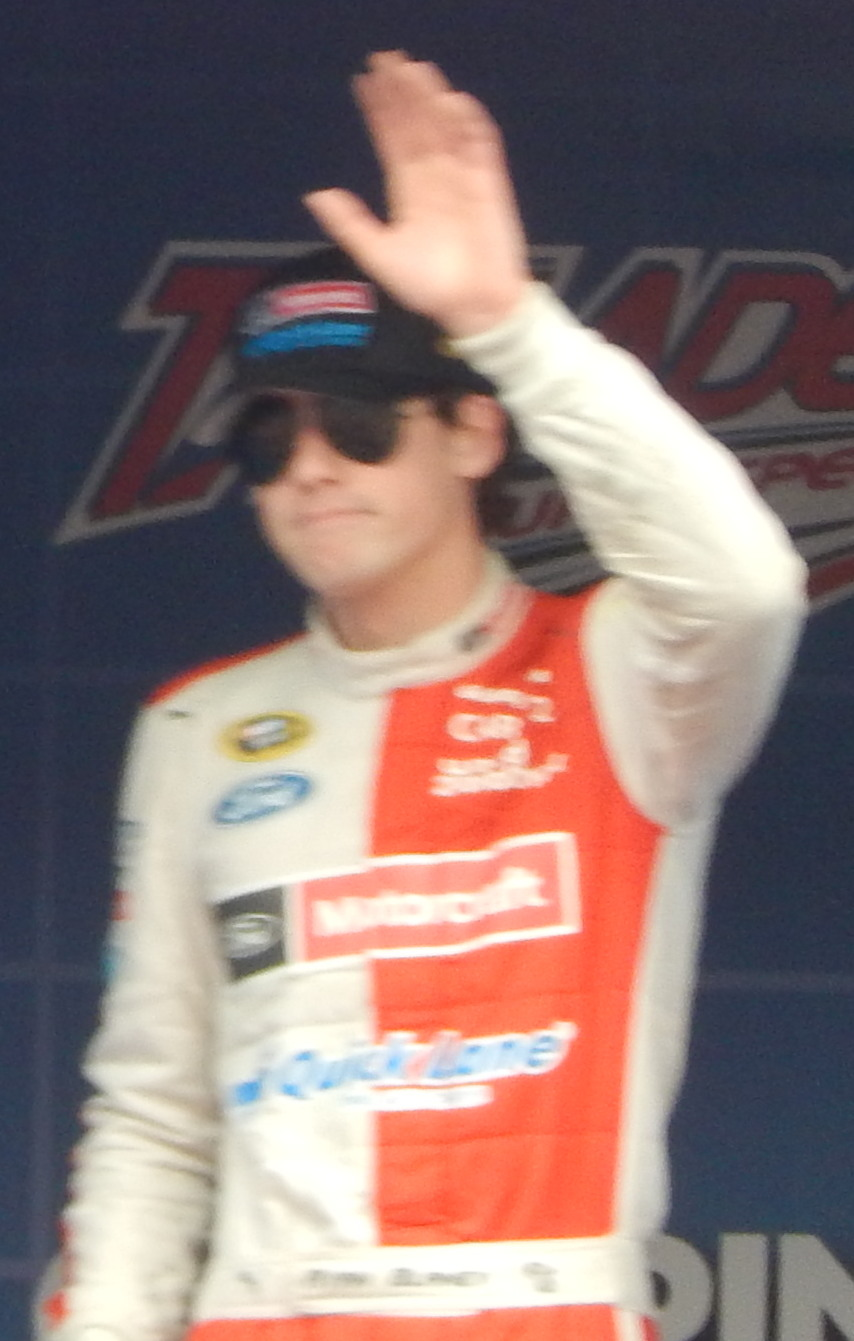
Ryan Blaney, shown here in 2015, won the Rookie of the Year honors.

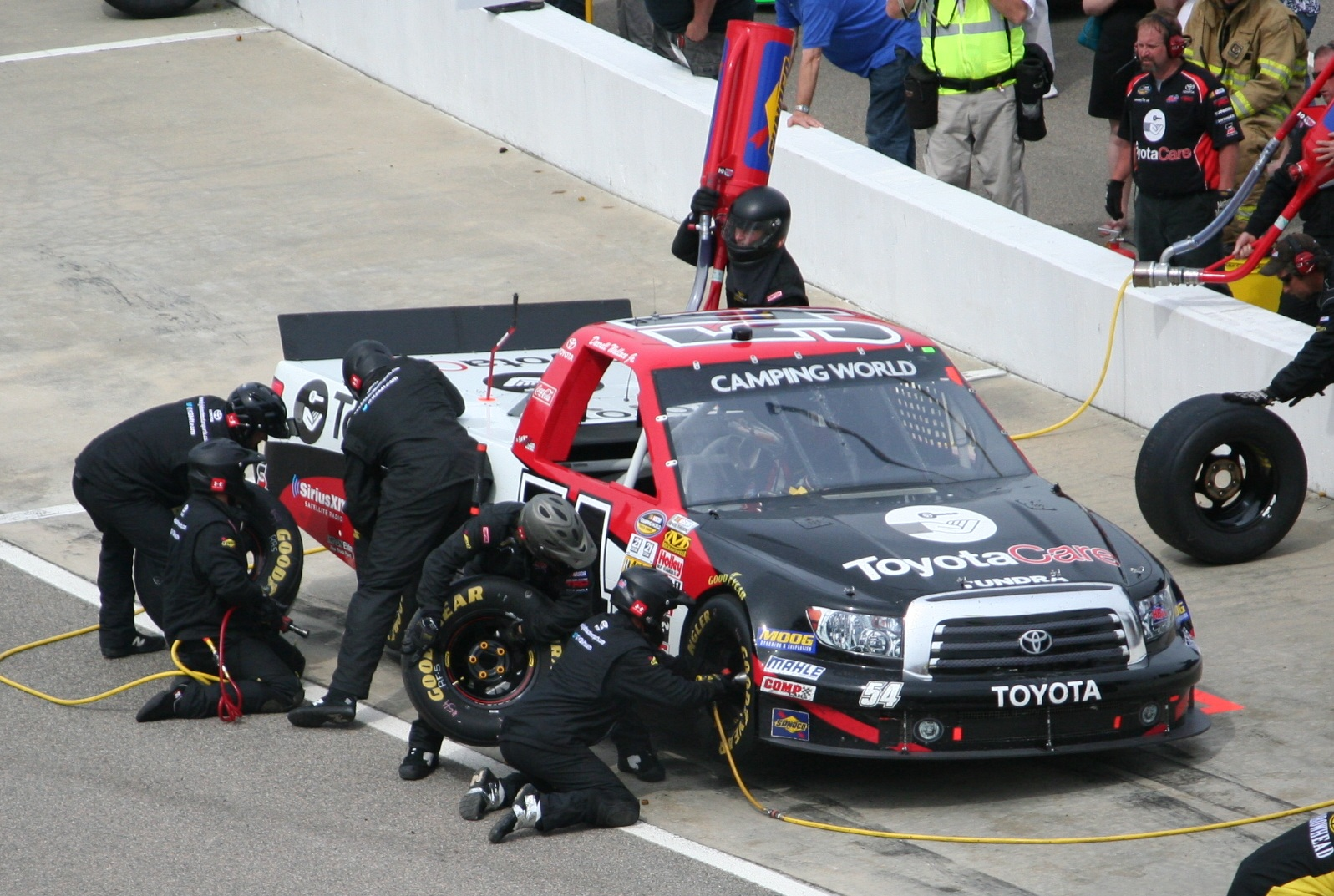
Toyota won the Manufacturer championship with 13 wins and 163 points.

The 2013 NASCAR Camping World Truck Series was the nineteenth season of the Camping World Truck Series, the pickup truck racing series sanctioned by NASCAR in North America. The season was contested over twenty-two races, beginning with the NextEra Energy Resources 250 at Daytona International Speedway and ending with the Ford EcoBoost 200 at Homestead–Miami Speedway. Matt Crafton of ThorSport Racing claimed his first championship with only one finish outside the top twenty and by completing every lap of the season. Toyota won the year's Manufacturers' Championship, while Kyle Busch Motorsports won the Owners' Championship, with its No. 51 entry.

== Teams and drivers ==
=== Complete schedule ===
Team	Manufacturer	No.	Race Driver	Crew Chief
Brad Keselowski Racing	Ford	19	Ross Chastain14	Chad Kendrick
Brad Keselowski Racing	Ford	19	Joey Logano3	Chad Kendrick
Brad Keselowski Racing	Ford	19	Brad Keselowski4	Chad Kendrick
Brad Keselowski Racing	Ford	19	Dave Blaney1	Chad Kendrick
Brad Keselowski Racing	Ford	29	Ryan Blaney (R)	Doug Randolph
Glenden Enterprises	Toyota; Ford; Chevrolet	84	Chris Fontaine1	Kevin Ingram; Dave Fuge Jr. Perry Mitchell; Tim Silva; Gregg Mixon; Carl Long; Robert May
Mike Harmon Racing	Toyota; Ford; Chevrolet	84	Robert Bruce1	Kevin Ingram; Dave Fuge Jr. Perry Mitchell; Tim Silva; Gregg Mixon; Carl Long; Robert May
Mike Harmon Racing	Toyota; Ford; Chevrolet	84	Mike Harmon13	Kevin Ingram; Dave Fuge Jr. Perry Mitchell; Tim Silva; Gregg Mixon; Carl Long; Robert May
MAKE Motorsports	Toyota; Ford; Chevrolet	84	Danny Efland3	Kevin Ingram; Dave Fuge Jr. Perry Mitchell; Tim Silva; Gregg Mixon; Carl Long; Robert May
MAKE Motorsports	Toyota; Ford; Chevrolet	84	Brad Riethmeyer1	Kevin Ingram; Dave Fuge Jr. Perry Mitchell; Tim Silva; Gregg Mixon; Carl Long; Robert May
Best Performance Motorsports	Toyota; Ford; Chevrolet	84	Jeff Babcock1	Kevin Ingram; Dave Fuge Jr. Perry Mitchell; Tim Silva; Gregg Mixon; Carl Long; Robert May
Rick Ware Racing	Toyota; Ford; Chevrolet	84	D. J. Kennington1	Kevin Ingram; Dave Fuge Jr. Perry Mitchell; Tim Silva; Gregg Mixon; Carl Long; Robert May
DGM Racing	Toyota; Ford; Chevrolet	84	Martin Roy1	Mario Gosselin
Jennifer Jo Cobb Racing	Chevrolet; Ram; Ford	10	Jennifer Jo Cobb21	Daniel Kolanda; Steve Kuykendall
Jennifer Jo Cobb Racing	Chevrolet; Ram; Ford	10	Joe Cobb1	Daniel Kolanda; Steve Kuykendall
Kyle Busch Motorsports	Toyota	18	Joey Coulter	Harold Holly
Kyle Busch Motorsports	Toyota	51	Kyle Busch11	Rick Ren; Ryan Fugle
Kyle Busch Motorsports	Toyota	51	Erik Jones5	Rick Ren; Ryan Fugle
Kyle Busch Motorsports	Toyota	51	Chad Hackenbracht4	Rick Ren; Ryan Fugle
Kyle Busch Motorsports	Toyota	51	Scott Bloomquist1	Rick Ren; Ryan Fugle
Kyle Busch Motorsports	Toyota	51	Denny Hamlin1	Rick Ren; Ryan Fugle
Kyle Busch Motorsports	Toyota	54	Bubba Wallace (R)	Jerry Baxter; Rick Ren
Norm Benning Racing	Chevrolet	57	Norm Benning	Brian Poff; Gary Ritter
NTS Motorsports	Chevrolet	9	Ron Hornaday Jr.21	Bruce Cook
NTS Motorsports	Chevrolet	9	Nelson Piquet Jr.1	Bruce Cook
NTS Motorsports	Chevrolet	24	Brennan Newberry (R)21	Eddie Pardue
NTS Motorsports	Chevrolet	24	Austin Dillon1	Eddie Pardue
Red Horse Racing	Toyota	7	John Wes Townley	Mike Beam
Red Horse Racing	Toyota	17	Timothy Peters	Butch Hylton
Red Horse Racing	Toyota	77	Germán Quiroga (R)	Dan Stillman
Richard Childress Racing	Chevrolet	3	Ty Dillon	Marcus Richmond
Richard Childress Racing	Chevrolet	62	Brendan Gaughan	Shane Wilson
Richard Childress Racing	Chevrolet	39	Austin Dillon1	Danny Stockman
RSS Racing	Chevrolet	39	Ryan Sieg18	Kevin Starland
RSS Racing	Chevrolet	39	Ryan Lynch2	Kevin Starland
DGM Racing	Chevrolet	39	Alex Guenette1	Bobby Dotter
Sharp Gallaher Racing	Chevrolet	8	Max Gresham	Chris Showalter
Peck Motorsports	Chevrolet	07	Todd Peck1	Keith Wolfe
SS-Green Light Racing	Toyota; Chevrolet	07	Chris Cockrum4	Butch Miller; Bryan Berry; Daniel Szymkowiak
SS-Green Light Racing	Toyota; Chevrolet	07	Grant Galloway1	Richard Goad
SS-Green Light Racing	Toyota; Chevrolet	07	Johnny Chapman1	Richard Goad
SS-Green Light Racing	Toyota; Chevrolet	07	Jamie Dick1	Jaron Antley
SS-Green Light Racing	Toyota; Chevrolet	07	C. J. Faison1	Mark McFarland
SS-Green Light Racing	Toyota; Chevrolet	07	Josh Reaume1	Daniel Szymkowiak
SS-Green Light Racing	Toyota; Chevrolet	07	J. J. Yeley5	Daniel Szymkowiak
SS-Green Light Racing	Toyota; Chevrolet	07	Carl Long1	Daniel Szymkowiak
SS-Green Light Racing	Toyota; Chevrolet	07	Caleb Roark1	Daniel Szymkowiak
SS-Green Light Racing	Toyota; Chevrolet	07	Jimmy Weller III3	Bobby Dotter; Daniel Szymkowiak; Cal Boprey
SS-Green Light Racing	Toyota; Chevrolet	07	Jake Crum1	Bobby Dotter; Daniel Szymkowiak; Cal Boprey
SS-Green Light Racing	Toyota; Chevrolet	81	David Starr11	Bryan Berry; Jason Miller; Bobby Dotter
SS-Green Light Racing	Toyota; Chevrolet	81	C. J. Faison1	Mark McFarland
SS-Green Light Racing	Toyota; Chevrolet	81	Jimmy Weller III2	Bobby Dotter
SS-Green Light Racing	Toyota; Chevrolet	81	Ricky Ehrgott1	Bobby Dotter
SS-Green Light Racing	Toyota; Chevrolet	81	Jake Crum1	Bobby Dotter
SS-Green Light Racing	Toyota; Chevrolet	81	Kenny Wallace2	Bryan Berry; Bobby Dotter
SS-Green Light Racing	Toyota; Chevrolet	81	Derek White1	George Church
SS-Green Light Racing	Toyota; Chevrolet	81	Matt Kurzejewski2	Cal Boprey
Rick Ware Racing	Chevrolet	81	Timmy Hill1	Cal Boprey
T3R2	Ford	99	Bryan Silas20	Gary Cogswell
T3R2	Ford	99	Chad McCumbee1	Gary Cogswell
Jennifer Jo Cobb Racing	Chevrolet	99	Chris Lafferty1	Gary Cogswell
ThorSport Racing	Toyota	88	Matt Crafton	Carl Joiner Jr.
ThorSport Racing	Toyota	98	Johnny Sauter	Joe Shear Jr. Jesse Saunders; Dennis Connor
Turn One Racing	Chevrolet	60	Dakoda Armstrong	Gere Kennon Jr. Joe Shear Jr. Doug George
Turner Scott Motorsports	Chevrolet	4	Jeb Burton (R)	Mike Hillman Jr.
Turner Scott Motorsports	Chevrolet	31	James Buescher	Michael Shelton
Turner Scott Motorsports	Chevrolet	32	Miguel Paludo	Jeff Hensley

=== Limited schedule ===
Team	Manufacturer	No.	Race Driver	Crew Chief	Round(s)
74 Operations, LLC	Chevrolet	44	J. R. Heffner	Steven Hart	1
Adrian Carriers Racing	Chevrolet	97	Steve Wallace	Nicholas Carlson	3
Ben Kennedy Racing	Chevrolet	96	Ben Kennedy	Chris Carrier	2
Bill Martel Racing	Chevrolet	59	Kyle Martel	Bill Martel	2
B. J. McLeod Motorsports	Chevrolet	78	B. J. McLeod	Brian MacDonald	1
Brad Keselowski Racing	Ford	2	Brad Keselowski	Shane Whitbeck	1
BRG Motorsports	Toyota	20	Parker Kligerman	Josh Bragg	1
Cefalia Motorsports	Chevrolet	12	Steve Smith	Garry Stephens	2
Clay Greenfield Motorsports	Ram	68	Clay Greenfield	Danny Gill	8
DDK Motorsports	Toyota	45	Nate Monteith	Wade Day	1
Empire Racing	Ford	82	Sean Corr	Ben Leslie; Jamie Jones	3
FDNY Racing	Chevrolet	28	Andy Seuss	Bob Rahilly	1
FDNY Racing	Chevrolet	28	Blake Koch	Bob Rahilly	1
FDNY Racing	Chevrolet	28	Dominick Casola	Bob Rahilly	1
Gallagher Motorsports	Chevrolet	21	Spencer Gallagher	Dave Hirsch	5
Glenden Enterprises	Toyota	83	Chris Fontaine	Kevin Boykin	1
Hattori Racing Enterprises	Toyota	16	Brett Moffitt	Jeriod Prince	1
Henderson Motorsports	Chevrolet	75	Caleb Holman	Butch Miller7; Kevin Dargie2	7
Norm Benning Racing	Chevrolet	75	Clay Greenfield	Butch Miller7; Kevin Dargie2	1
Norm Benning Racing	Chevrolet	75	Todd Peck	Butch Miller7; Kevin Dargie2	1
Norm Benning Racing	Chevrolet	75	Morgan Shepherd	Butch Miller7; Kevin Dargie2	1
Hendrick Motorsports	Chevrolet	94	Chase Elliott	Lance McGrew	9
Hillman Racing; Team 7 Motorsports	Chevrolet	27	Jeff Agnew	Doug Weddle; Mark Hillman	15
Jake Crum Racing	Chevrolet	01	Jake Crum	Doug George	1
Jennifer Jo Cobb Racing	Ram; Ford; Chevrolet	0	Scott Saunders	Steve Kuykendall	1
Jennifer Jo Cobb Racing	Ram; Ford; Chevrolet	0	Chris Lafferty	Scott Kazura; David Walls; Daniel Kolanda	10
Ken Schrader Racing	Toyota	52	Tyler Reddick	Donnie Richeson	1
Ken Schrader Racing	Toyota	52	Ken Schrader	Donnie Richeson	2
MB Motorsports	Ford; Chevrolet	63	Scott Stenzel	Mike Mittler	2
MB Motorsports	Ford; Chevrolet	63	Justin Jennings	Mike Mittler	8
NTS Motorsports	Chevrolet	14	Kevin Harvick	David Cropps2; Jeff Stankiewicz1	2
NTS Motorsports	Chevrolet	14	Max Papis	David Cropps2; Jeff Stankiewicz1	1
Peck Motorsports	Chevrolet	40	Todd Peck	Keith Wolfe	1
RBR Enterprises	Chevrolet	92	Scott Riggs	Ricky Benton; Michael Hester	7
RBR Enterprises	Chevrolet	92	Clay Rogers	Ricky Benton; Michael Hester	1
RBR Enterprises	Chevrolet	92	Matt McCall	Ricky Benton; Michael Hester	1
Rick Ware Racing	Chevrolet	1	Dusty Davis	Dave Fuge Jr. George Church	1
Rick Ware Racing	Chevrolet	1	Timmy Hill	Dave Fuge Jr. George Church	1
Rick Ware Racing	Chevrolet	1	D. J. Kennington	Dave Fuge Jr. George Church	1
MAKE Motorsports	Chevrolet	1	Jonathan Davenport	Carl Long	1
MAKE Motorsports	Chevrolet	1	T. J. Bell	Danny Efland	1
MAKE Motorsports	Chevrolet	50	Rick Crawford	Dennis Conner	1
MAKE Motorsports	Chevrolet	50	Danny Efland	Perry Mitchell	5
MAKE Motorsports	Chevrolet	50	Brad Riethmeyer	Perry Mitchell	1
RSS Racing	Chevrolet	38	J. J. Yeley	Chico Garcia1; Tony Wilson1; Timothy Brown5; Carl Long1	2
RSS Racing	Chevrolet	38	Johnny Chapman	Chico Garcia1; Tony Wilson1; Timothy Brown5; Carl Long1	2
RSS Racing	Chevrolet	38	Chris Jones	Chico Garcia1; Tony Wilson1; Timothy Brown5; Carl Long1	3
RSS Racing	Chevrolet	38	Tony Raines	Chico Garcia1; Tony Wilson1; Timothy Brown5; Carl Long1	1
RSS Racing	Chevrolet	38	Scott Riggs	Chico Garcia1; Tony Wilson1; Timothy Brown5; Carl Long1	1
RSS Racing	Chevrolet	38	Chad Frewaldt	Chico Garcia1; Tony Wilson1; Timothy Brown5; Carl Long1	1
RSS Racing	Chevrolet	93	Jason White	Tony Wilson; Timothy Brown	1
RSS Racing	Chevrolet	93	Chris Jones	Tony Wilson; Timothy Brown	15
RSS Racing	Chevrolet	93	Ryan Sieg	Tony Wilson; Timothy Brown	2
RSS Racing	Chevrolet	93	Travis Kvapil	Tony Wilson; Timothy Brown	1
SunEnergy1 Racing	Toyota	93	Kenny Habul	Bryan Berry	1
Devin Jones Racing	Chevrolet	6	Devin Jones	Cody Sauls	1
Young's Motorsports	Chevrolet	6	Tyler Young	Cody Sauls	1
MAKE Motorsports	Chevrolet	6	Danny Efland	Bradley Lowe	1
Sharp Gallaher Racing	Chevrolet	6	Justin Lofton	Eddie Troconis; Randy Dean; Bryan Berry	8
Sharp Gallaher Racing	Chevrolet	6	Jared Landers	Randy Dean	1
Sharp Gallaher Racing	Chevrolet	6	Mike Skeen	Bryan Berry	1
Sharp Gallaher Racing	Chevrolet	6	Daniel Hemric	Bryan Berry	2
Sharp Gallaher Racing	Chevrolet	6	Austin Dillon	Bryan Berry	1
Sharp Gallaher Racing	Chevrolet	33	John King	Jamie Jones	1
Turner Scott Motorsports	Chevrolet	33	Brandon Jones	Mike Greci	3
Turner Scott Motorsports	Chevrolet	33	Cale Gale	Mike Greci	2
Turner Scott Motorsports	Chevrolet	30	Cale Gale	Chris Carrier	1
Turner Scott Motorsports	Chevrolet	30	Ryan Truex	Chris Carrier	1
Turner Scott Motorsports	Chevrolet	30	Nelson Piquet Jr.	Chris Carrier	1
Turner Scott Motorsports	Chevrolet	30	Kyle Larson	Trent Owens	2
Turner Scott Motorsports	Chevrolet	30	Todd Bodine	Jimmy Villeneuve	1
Turner Scott Motorsports	Chevrolet	30	Ben Kennedy	Chris Carrier	3
Turner Scott Motorsports	Chevrolet	34	Ryan Newman	Chris Carrier	1
Turner Scott Motorsports	Chevrolet	34	Ron Hornaday Jr.	Trent Owens	1
SWM-NEMCO Racing	Toyota	22	John Hunter Nemechek	Steven Gray	2
ThorSport Racing	Toyota	13	Todd Bodine	Jeriod Prince	7
ThorSport Racing	Toyota	13	Brett Moffitt	Jeriod Prince	1
ThorSport Racing	Toyota	13	Frank Kimmel	Jeriod Prince	2
ThorSport Racing	Toyota	13	Tracy Hines	Jeriod Prince	1
Wauters Motorsports	Ford; Chevrolet	5	Tim George Jr.	Richie Wauters	10
Wauters Motorsports	Ford; Chevrolet	5	Jason Bowles	Richie Wauters	1
Win-Tron Racing	Chevrolet	35	Mason Mingus	Mark Rette	3
Young's Motorsports	Chevrolet	02	Tyler Young	Jeff Stankiewicz	6

== Schedule ==
The final calendar was released on November 28, 2012, containing 22 races. Speed was re-launched in August as Fox Sports 1. The two iterations televised every race in the United States.

No.	Race title	Track	Location	Date
1	NextEra Energy Resources 250	Daytona International Speedway	Daytona Beach, Florida	February 22
2	Kroger 250	Martinsville Speedway	Martinsville, Virginia	April 6
3	North Carolina Education Lottery 200	Rockingham Speedway	Rockingham, North Carolina	April 14
4	SFP 250	Kansas Speedway	Kansas City, Kansas	April 20
5	North Carolina Education Lottery 200	Charlotte Motor Speedway	Concord, North Carolina	May 17
6	Lucas Oil 200	Dover International Speedway	Dover, Delaware	May 31
7	WinStar World Casino 400K	Texas Motor Speedway	Fort Worth, Texas	June 7
8	UNOH 225	Kentucky Speedway	Sparta, Kentucky	June 27
9	American Ethanol 200	Iowa Speedway	Newton, Iowa	July 13
10	Mudsummer Classic	Eldora Speedway	New Weston, Ohio	July 24
11	Pocono Mountains 125	Pocono Raceway	Long Pond, Pennsylvania	August 3
12	Michigan National Guard 200	Michigan International Speedway	Cambridge Township, Michigan	August 17
13	UNOH 200	Bristol Motor Speedway	Bristol, Tennessee	August 21
14	Chevrolet Silverado 250	Canadian Tire Motorsport Park	Clarington, Ontario, Canada	September 1
15	Fan Appreciation 200	Iowa Speedway	Newton, Iowa	September 8
16	EnjoyIllinois.com 225	Chicagoland Speedway	Joliet, Illinois	September 13
17	Smith's 350	Las Vegas Motor Speedway	Las Vegas, Nevada	September 28
18	Fred's 250	Talladega Superspeedway	Lincoln, Alabama	October 19
19	Kroger 200	Martinsville Speedway	Martinsville, Virginia	October 26
20	WinStar World Casino 350K	Texas Motor Speedway	Fort Worth, Texas	November 1
21	Lucas Oil 150	Phoenix International Raceway	Avondale, Arizona	November 8
22	Ford EcoBoost 200	Homestead–Miami Speedway	Homestead, Florida	November 15

== Season summary ==
NASCAR modified the minimum age of 18 rule imposed in 2002 as a response to the ejection of 16-year old Kyle Busch at the 2001 Marlboro 500 CART race to meet regulations of the Tobacco Master Settlement Agreement in 1998. With no tobacco sponsors allowed in NASCAR, the minimum age for Camping World Truck Series drivers became a sliding scale. Drivers 16 and 17 can now participate at races in short tracks (1.25 miles and shorter) and road courses. The minimum age remains 18 for intermediate tracks (longer than 1.25 miles) and superspeedways.

The Camping World Truck Series started its 2013 season at Daytona International Speedway. Johnny Sauter would hold off Kyle Busch over the last few laps to avenge his loss in 2012 and take the victory. Following a month-long break, the Trucks returned to action at Martinsville Speedway. Rookie polesitter Jeb Burton would dominate most of the race. However, Daytona winner Sauter passed Burton with 17 to go, and pulled away from teammate Matt Crafton to win his second race in a row. The trucks traveled to Rockingham Speedway for the first stand-alone weekend of the season. Nationwide regular Kyle Larson dominated the race, leading 187 laps and cruising to his first career win. Ron Hornaday Jr. was penalized late in the race for intentionally sending Bubba Wallace into the fences, later fined $25,000 and was put on probation until June 12.

The Truck Series returned to action at the repaved Kansas Speedway. James Buescher, who dominated the intermediate tracks en route to the 2012 title, dominated the race, but was hampered by a slow four tire pit stop late in the race. Matt Crafton and Joey Coulter would inherit the top two positions, and the two would swap the lead for the final 30 laps until Crafton prevailed, taking his 3rd career Truck win since 2011. At Charlotte Motor Speedway, Kyle Busch would rally from a pre-race engine change and would drive past Miguel Paludo late in the race to claim his first Truck Series win since 2011.

With a week off, the Truck Series returned to action at Dover International Speedway. Polesitter Bubba Wallace would dominate the race. However, teammate and boss Kyle Busch took the lead from Wallace and Matt Crafton on lap 145 and never looked back, taking his second consecutive win of the season. At Texas, Ty Dillon would have the dominant truck, though four-time Texas winner Brendan Gaughan took the lead from Dillon during the middle portion of the race. However, a loose truck would take Gaughan out of contention. On the restart at lap 144, rookie Jeb Burton drove past Dillon and held him off for his first career win. At Kentucky Speedway, Wallace once again dominated the race, leading 54 laps, but was taken out in a mid race incident with polesitter Ryan Blaney. Ty Dillon would inherit the lead from Kyle Busch and easily held off Busch and Brad Keselowski for his first win of the season.

The Truck Series arrived at the Eldora Speedway for the inaugural Mudsummer Classic, the first race on dirt in any series since 1970. Ken Schrader started on pole, the oldest pole sitter in any NASCAR series at 58 years, but Austin Dillon and Kyle Larson battled for the lead throughout most of the race, with Dillon leading a race-high 63 laps. Dillon held off Larson and Ryan Newman on a green-white-checker finish to win his first start of the year. The Trucks would then trek to Pocono Raceway. After a brief rain delay before the race, Ryan Blaney pulled away from pole sitter Miguel Paludo on the second green white checkered attempt to take his first win of the season. After a week off, the series returned to action at Michigan International Speedway. Polesitter Jeb Burton would dominate most of the race, seeking his second win of the year. Defending champion James Buescher would take the lead late in the race from Kyle Busch and would go on to take his first win of the season. At Bristol Motor Speedway, defending winner Timothy Peters led most of the race. However, Kyle Busch would rally from a penalty to take the lead late from Peters and hold off his late pass attempt to take the win.

The Trucks made their inaugural trip to Canadian Tire Motorsport Park and the series' first road course since 2000 for the Chevrolet Silverado 250. Chase Elliott led most of the first half, and Ty Dillon would dominate most of the second half of the race. However, Dillon's strategy of pitting on lap 35 of 64 forced him to stretch his fuel. Elliott would chase down Dillon through the last 15 laps. On the final lap in turn 10 (the final corner), Dillon attempted to block the inside line from Elliott, but Elliott spun Dillon and went on to become the youngest winner in series history, at 17 years, 9 months and 4 days.

The Trucks then made their return to Iowa Speedway. Ross Chastain would dominate most of the race, leading 116 laps. Due to NASCAR allowing the teams only two sets of tires, James Buescher made the call to pit late to take a final set of sticker tires while others had used up their sets. This would prove to be the winning move as Buescher made his way past Chastain and held him off on two green white checkered attempts to take his second win of the season. At Chicago, Kyle Busch would dominate most of the race, but would have to fend off Brad Keselowski for his fourth Truck Series win. The Trucks then made their stop at the Las Vegas Motor Speedway. Late in the race, Ron Hornaday Jr. looked to snap his winless streak. However, Jennifer Jo Cobb slammed the wall, forcing a restart with 2 to go. Hornaday spun his tires, allowing Timothy Peters to get by and take his first win on an intermediate track.

With the season winding down, the Truck Series traveled south to Talladega Superspeedway. Most of the afternoon would be dominated by survival. On the final run to the finish, Daytona winner Johnny Sauter, with a push from teammate Matt Crafton, vaulted ahead of the field in the tri-oval and took his third win of the season as chaos erupted behind him. The Trucks then returned to Martinsville Speedway. There, outside polesitter Bubba Wallace would dominate the race, while Cup drivers Denny Hamlin and Kevin Harvick were taken out in separate incidents. Wallace would hold off Brendan Gaughan over the final 10 laps to take his first career win in the Truck Series, becoming only the second African American to win in NASCAR's top 3 series. Returning to Texas Motor Speedway, Ty Dillon would dominate the night, leading 130 of 147 laps en route to his third win of the season and the 100th win for the No. 3 in NASCAR's top series. Trekking out to the Phoenix International Raceway, it would be an all-night duel between young drivers Erik Jones and Ross Chastain. Following a caution caused by dual spins by Timothy Peters and Bubba Wallace, Jones would pass Chastain on the restart with 10 to go and hang on to become the youngest winner in series history at 17 years, 5 months and 9 days, beating Chase Elliott's record from September. Points leader Matt Crafton continued his top-10 form, and only needed to start the final round at Homestead to win his maiden NASCAR championship.

At the season finale at Homestead–Miami Speedway, while Crafton wrapped up the championship by starting his engine, the Owners Championship and Rookie of the Year battles were still to be decided. The night would be dominated by polesitter Ryan Blaney and Kyle Busch, the latter trying to win the owners championship. It seemed as though Crafton's 88 team would wrap up both championships when he crashed on lap 136 with Joey Coulter and Brennan Newberry. Busch would hold off Blaney and Jeb Burton on three green-white-checkered finishes to take his sixth win of the season and claim the Owners Championship with Crafton finishing 21st. Blaney would claim Rookie of the Year honors over Burton and Bubba Wallace.

== Results and standings ==
=== Races ===
No.	Race	Pole position	Most laps led	Winning driver	Winning manufacturer
1	NextEra Energy Resources 250	Brennan Newberry	Ty Dillon	Johnny Sauter	Toyota
2	Kroger 250	Jeb Burton	Jeb Burton	Johnny Sauter	Toyota
3	North Carolina Education Lottery 200	Jeb Burton	Kyle Larson	Kyle Larson	Chevrolet
4	SFP 250	James Buescher	James Buescher	Matt Crafton	Toyota
5	North Carolina Education Lottery 200	Jeb Burton	Kyle Busch	Kyle Busch	Toyota
6	Lucas Oil 200	Bubba Wallace	Bubba Wallace	Kyle Busch	Toyota
7	WinStar World Casino 400K	Johnny Sauter	Ty Dillon	Jeb Burton	Chevrolet
8	UNOH 225	Ryan Blaney	Bubba Wallace	Ty Dillon	Chevrolet
9	American Ethanol 200	Germán Quiroga	Ty Dillon	Timothy Peters	Toyota
10	Mudsummer Classic	Ken Schrader	Austin Dillon	Austin Dillon	Chevrolet
11	Pocono Mountains 125	Miguel Paludo	Ryan Blaney	Ryan Blaney	Ford
12	Michigan National Guard 200	Jeb Burton	Jeb Burton	James Buescher	Chevrolet
13	UNOH 200	Chase Elliott	Timothy Peters	Kyle Busch	Toyota
14	Chevrolet Silverado 250	James Buescher	Ty Dillon	Chase Elliott	Chevrolet
15	Fan Appreciation 200	Ross Chastain	Ross Chastain	James Buescher	Chevrolet
16	EnjoyIllinois.com 225	Jeb Burton	Kyle Busch	Kyle Busch	Toyota
17	Smith's 350	Ty Dillon	Matt Crafton	Timothy Peters	Toyota
18	Fred's 250	Jeb Burton	Ty Dillon	Johnny Sauter	Toyota
19	Kroger 200	Denny Hamlin	Bubba Wallace	Bubba Wallace	Toyota
20	WinStar World Casino 350K	Jeb Burton	Ty Dillon	Ty Dillon	Chevrolet
21	Lucas Oil 150	Ross Chastain	Erik Jones	Erik Jones	Toyota
22	Ford EcoBoost 200	Ryan Blaney	Ryan Blaney	Kyle Busch	Toyota

=== Drivers' standings ===
(key) Bold - Pole position awarded by time. Italics - Pole position earned by final practice results or rainout. * – Most laps led.

Pos	Driver	DAY	MAR	CAR	KAN	CLT	DOV	TEX	KEN	IOW	ELD	POC	MCH	BRI	MSP	IOW	CHI	LVS	TAL	MAR	TEX	PHO	HOM	Points
1	Matt Crafton	9	2	6	1	4	2	4	10	6	8	8	9	10	10	7	4	11*	9	17	10	5	21	804
2	Ty Dillon	6*	18	12	8	5	31	2*	1	16*	16	20	3	6	17*	3	5	**4**	14*	22	1*	4	14	764
3	James Buescher	13	14	14	**6***	6	15	9	4	3	19	21	1	7	**9**	1	8	9	26	10	6	9	13	761
4	Johnny Sauter	1	1	4	5	28	7	**7**	12	11	29	19	20	4	28	4	10	2	1	8	2	8	16	732
5	Jeb Burton **(R)**	5	**3***	**7**	15	**13**	9	1	9	22	18	12	**10***	12	22	8	**9**	12	**18**	3	**26**	11	3	731
6	Ryan Blaney **(R)**	8	16	8	3	25	3	8	**5**	26	15	1*	32	3	16	10	3	20	21	5	15	7	**2***	726
7	Brendan Gaughan	29	12	3	4	2	5	5	27	31	5	9	8	16	18	24	25	8	11	2	4	3	4	717
8	Bubba Wallace **(R)**	12	5	27	7	27	**10***	6	28*	8	7	7	21	28	4	5	11	5	17	1*	7	20	15	704
9	Miguel Paludo	7	17	10	31	7	18	10	7	7	21	2	5	13	3	14	12	3	19	21	8	31	11	697
10	Timothy Peters	27	4	26	10	26	6	14	6	1	6	14	6	2*	8	12	27	1	29	26	16	16	9	683
11	John Wes Townley	21	32	11	32	8	11	15	11	12	22	17	7	30	12	11	6	7	7	13	9	27	6	641
12	Dakoda Armstrong	19	7	17	12	12	21	11	21	10	11	18	13	18	19	16	17	16	5	18	17	19	23	628
13	Germán Quiroga **(R)**	25	29	19	11	35	13	3	8	**14**	20	3	19	21	15	6	14	21	31	7	14	12	7	625
14	Ron Hornaday Jr.	3	10	15	9	30	12	12	17	4	28	6	11	8	5	17	13	6	24	28	3	28	5^{1}	612
15	Joey Coulter	22	15	13	2	32	8	25	16	9	4	4	14	11	26	25	23	13	27	12	12	26	27	605
16	Max Gresham	24	30	16	25	3	28	22	31	15	10	13	18	15	24	13	19	10	8	11	18	15	22	579
17	Ryan Sieg	10	8	22	29	15	17	16	20	18		30	15	32		21	21	19	23	25	11	17	12	500
18	Ross Chastain	14	20			9	16	13		13		5			7	**2***		14	3	14		**2**	8	484
19	Brennan Newberry **(R)**	**33**	31	21	20	18	24	20	32	19	27	10	12	25	27	22		15	32	24	13	18	29	452
20	Norm Benning	17	33	33	26	DNQ	29	23	25	30	26	28	22	33	20	28	32	26	12	29	30	24	28	370
21	Bryan Silas	32	34	23	19	34	22		22	29	DNQ	24	16	29	11	33	24	22	16	33	27	33		354
22	Chase Elliott		6	5			4			5				**5**	1	31				20		10		315
23	Jeff Agnew	23	23	35	23	21	23	15		20		23		31		30	18		28	15			18	314
24	David Starr	31	13	20	13	23	14	17						23					2		23	23		284
25	Jennifer Jo Cobb	35	36	31	17	DNQ	27	27	26	32		32	25	DNQ	23	26	28	23	DNQ	DNQ	29	25	DNQ	262
26	Tim George Jr.	16	22	18	14	16	25	21	18	23		16												252
27	Justin Lofton	4				10								14		19	15	18	20		5			250
28	Todd Bodine	11	11	32	21	17	19	18				11												215
29	Erik Jones		9	9						2						9						1*		195
30	Chris Jones			34	34	36	34	30	34^{1}	34	Wth	31	27	36		32	36	27	35	35	32^{1}	32	35	177
31	Justin Jennings				18			24	30	28	23					23	30				19			157
32	Tyler Young			24		29		19		27				24			22				24			139
33	Ben Kennedy													20		15	16			4			30	135
34	Caleb Holman		21	29		33	20							17					30	23				135
35	Chris Lafferty						35	29	36	35		34	26		30	36	35	29			35		Wth	124
36	Chad Hackenbracht							26				15			2			17						116
37	Cale Gale								13													6	10	103
38	Clay Greenfield	26	DNQ	DNQ	16				35^{1}		DNQ			34					13	27^{1}				87
39	Jimmy Weller III									24	DNQ					35	26			36			17	82
40	Chris Cockrum	15				22		28											34					77
41	Brandon Jones													27		20				19				67
42	Spencer Gallagher			DNQ	22															DNQ	20		32	58
43	Brett Moffitt								14				17											57
44	Jake Crum					31							28	19										54
45	John Hunter Nemechek																			16		21		51
46	Mason Mingus																		36			22	25	49
47	Daniel Hemric																			32		13		43
48	Frank Kimmel									21													24	43
49	Chris Fontaine	34																	15					40
50	Kyle Martel						26					22												40
51	C. J. Faison						30		19															39
52	Ryan Lynch								24												25			39
53	Matt Kurzejewski															27		24						37
54	Jared Landers										12													32
55	Todd Peck								29			27	31^{1}											32
56	Tracy Hines										13													31
57	Mike Skeen														13									31
58	Sean Corr	DNQ										26							33					29
59	Steve Smith															29						30		29
60	John King	18																						26
61	D. J. Kennington																					36	26	26
62	B. J. McLeod																						19	25
63	Dusty Davis	20																						24
64	Matt McCall													22										22
65	Devin Jones		24																					20
66	Scott Stenzel	DNQ																	25					19
67	Clay Rogers			25																				19
68	Josh Reaume									25														19
69	Scott Bloomquist										25													19
70	Alex Guenette														25									19
71	Grant Galloway		27																					17
72	Johnny Chapman			28			36^{1}	32^{1}																16
73	Ryan Truex **(R)**	28																						16
74	Robert Bruce		28																					16
75	Caleb Roark																	28						16
76	Dominick Casola											29												15
77	Tyler Reddick			30																				14
78	Jeff Babcock										30													14
79	Chad McCumbee																						33	11
80	Brad Riethmeyer																			34			DNQ	10
81	Nate Monteith													35										9
82	Scott Saunders				36																			8
83	Ricky Ehrgott											36												8
	Chad Frewaldt																					29^{1}		0
	Rick Crawford	DNQ																						0
	Jonathan Davenport		DNQ																					0
	Andy Seuss			DNQ																				0
	Joe Cobb										DNQ													0
	J. R. Heffner										DNQ													0
Ineligible for Camping World Truck championship points
Pos	Driver	DAY	MAR	CAR	KAN	CLT	DOV	TEX	KEN	IOW	ELD	POC	MCH	BRI	MSP	IOW	CHI	LVS	TAL	MAR	TEX	PHO	HOM	Points
	Kyle Busch	2			27	1*	1		3				2	1			1*		10		28		1	
	Kyle Larson			1*							2													
	Austin Dillon										1*						7						20	
	Brad Keselowski					14			2					9			2				21			
	Joey Logano			2	24								4											
	Ryan Newman										3													
	Parker Kligerman																		4					
	Timmy Hill																		6	31				
	Max Papis														6									
	Denny Hamlin																			**6**				
	Scott Riggs	36	35			11			23				29				29			9	22			
	Dave Blaney										9													
	Steve Wallace									17						18						14		
	Ken Schrader										**14**			26										
	Martin Roy														14									
	Kenny Wallace										17						20							
	Nelson Piquet Jr.		19																				31	
	Blake Koch					19																		
	Danny Efland				28	20	33	31	33	33			30				33		DNQ					
	Derek White														21									
	Mike Harmon			36	33	24	32					25	23	DNQ		34	31	25	22		31	34		
	J. J. Yeley				35							33	24				34				33	35	36	
	Jason Bowles										24													
	Kevin Harvick		25																	30				
	Kenny Habul		26																					
	Carl Long														29								Wth	
	Jason White	30																						
	Jamie Dick				30																			
	Morgan Shepherd																				34			
	Travis Kvapil																						34	
	Tony Raines											35												
	T. J. Bell			DNQ																				
Pos	Driver	DAY	MAR	CAR	KAN	CLT	DOV	TEX	KEN	IOW	ELD	POC	MCH	BRI	MSP	IOW	CHI	LVS	TAL	MAR	TEX	PHO	HOM	Points
^{1} – Post entry, driver and owner did not score points.

=== Manufacturer ===
Pos	Manufacturer	Wins	Points
1	Toyota	13	**163**
2	Chevrolet	8	**142**
3	Ford	1	**113**
4	Ram	0	**57**

== See also ==
- 2013 NASCAR Sprint Cup Series
- 2013 NASCAR Nationwide Series
- 2013 NASCAR K&N Pro Series East
- 2013 NASCAR K&N Pro Series West
- 2013 NASCAR Whelen Modified Tour
- 2013 NASCAR Whelen Southern Modified Tour
- 2013 ARCA Racing Series
- 2013 NASCAR Canadian Tire Series
- 2013 NASCAR Toyota Series
- 2013 NASCAR Whelen Euro Series
