= J. R. Heffner =

American racing driver (born 1972)

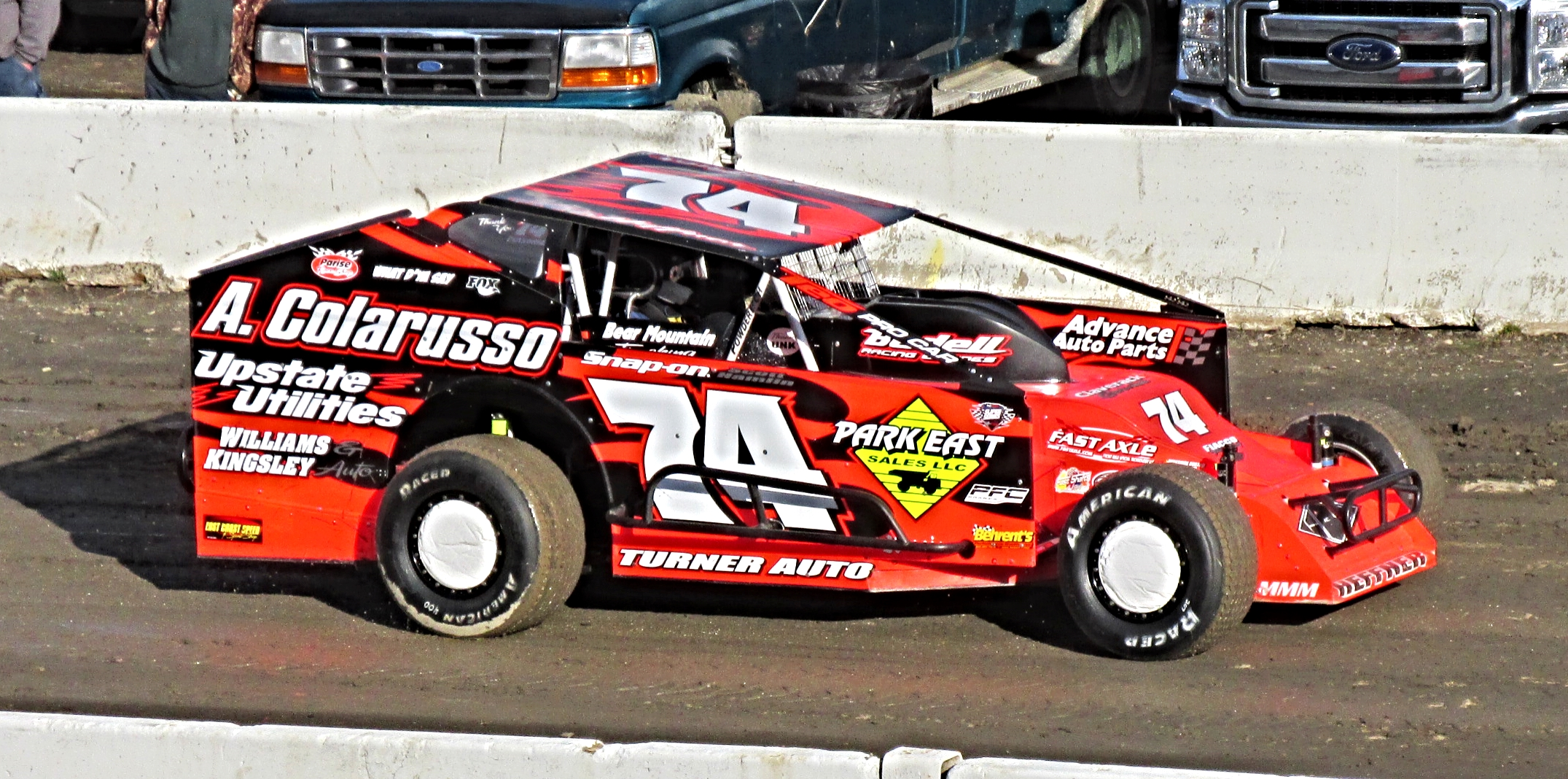
- Heffner's No. 74 modified race car in 2015 at the Orange County (NY) Fairgrounds
- Born: March 31, 1972 (age 54); Stephentown, New York, U.S.

NASCAR FedEx Freight Truck Series career
- 4 races run over 3 years
- 2018 position: 75th
- Best finish: 52nd (2014)
- First race: 2014 Mudsummer Classic (Eldora)
- Last race: 2018 Eldora Dirt Derby (Eldora)
| Wins | Top tens | Poles |
|---|---|---|
| 0 | 0 | 0 |
- Statistics up to date as of December 31, 2021.

J. R. Heffner (born March 31, 1972) is an American professional dirt and asphalt stock car driver. He currently competes in various dirt racing events.

Heffner has also raced in the ARCA Racing Series and NASCAR Camping World Truck Series.

== Racing career ==
Heffner's interest in racing started at the age of five, when he and his parents attended races at Lebanon Valley Speedway. In his teen years, he raced three-wheelers and eventually started racing in Lebanon Valley's Sportsman's Division, winning the championship in 1990. He moved up to the Big Block Modified division, winning his first race in the division in 1994. In 1997, he acquired sponsorship from A. Colarusso & Son, Inc., a highway construction firm. Heffner and Colarusso have developed a longterm relationship. Heffner joined the company in 2003, becoming the Vice President of Operations, a role he still holds today.

In 2007, Heffner made his debut in the ARCA Re/Max Series at Daytona International Speedway for DGM Racing, where he finished 35th after crashing. From 2007 to 2011, he ran eight ARCA races, with his last start being at Lucas Oil Raceway. His best finish in the series is 14th at Kentucky Speedway in 2009.

In 2013, Heffner entered the NASCAR Camping World Truck Series' Mudsummer Classic at Eldora Speedway, the first dirt track race in a NASCAR national series since 1970. In the event, Heffner qualified eighth and finished second in his heat race to Ken Schrader, but was relegated to the Last Chance Qualifier (LCQ). Despite starting first, he lost fourth gear and retired from the LCQ, finishing last after completing just one lap and failing to make the Feature. The following year, Heffner made the feature after finishing fourth in his heat, finishing 18th in the final. Heffner also ran the Truck race at New Hampshire Motor Speedway, finishing 23rd after crashing on lap 137. Heffner skipped the 2015 race at Eldora due to the race clashing with his schedule at Lebanon Valley, loaning the truck to Bobby Pierce, who finished second. In 2016, Heffner returned to Eldora, driving the No. 44 for Martins Motorsports. After winning his heat race from the pole to start fourth in the feature, he finished 15th. A year later, Heffner crashed during practice and with no backup, he withdrew from the race. Heffner would return to the Dirt Derby in 2018, securing a ride with Premium Motorsports. He qualified for the main event by finishing fourth in his heat race, and finished 24th in the feature after fading from a top-15 position late with handling problems.

Heffner made his return to the Truck Series in March 2021 when he joined Jordan Anderson Racing for the Bristol Motor Speedway dirt race. However, he withdrew after crashing in the final practice session.

== Motorsports career results ==
=== NASCAR ===
(key) (Bold – Pole position awarded by qualifying time. Italics – Pole position earned by points standings or practice time. * – Most laps led.)

==== Camping World Truck Series ====
NASCAR Camping World Truck Series results
| Year | Team | No. | Make | 1 | 2 | 3 | 4 | 5 | 6 | 7 | 8 | 9 | 10 | 11 | 12 | 13 | 14 | 15 | 16 | 17 | 18 | 19 | 20 | 21 | 22 | 23 | NCWTC | Pts | Ref |
|---|---|---|---|---|---|---|---|---|---|---|---|---|---|---|---|---|---|---|---|---|---|---|---|---|---|---|---|---|---|
| 2013 | 74 Operations LLC. | 44 | Chevy | DAY | MAR | CAR | KAN | CLT | DOV | TEX | KEN | IOW | ELD; DNQ | POC | MCH | BRI | MSP | IOW | CHI | LVS | TAL | MAR | TEX | PHO | HOM | | 120th | – | |
| 2014 | MB Motorsports | 63 | Chevy | DAY | MAR | KAN | CLT | DOV | TEX | GTW | KEN | IOW | ELD; 18 | POC | MCH | BRI | MSP | CHI | NHA; 23 | LVS | TAL | MAR | TEX | PHO | HOM | | 52nd | 47 | |
| 2016 | Martins Motorsports | 44 | Chevy | DAY | ATL | MAR | KAN | DOV | CLT | TEX | IOW | GTW | KEN | ELD; 15 | POC | BRI | MCH | MSP | CHI | NHA | LVS | TAL | MAR | TEX | PHO | HOM | 56th | 18 | |
| 2017 | Martins Motorsports | 44 | Chevy | DAY | ATL | MAR | KAN | CLT | DOV | TEX | GTW | IOW | KEN | ELD; Wth | POC | MCH | BRI | MSP | CHI | NHA | LVS | TAL | MAR | TEX | PHO | HOM | NA | – | |
| 2018 | Premium Motorsports | 15 | Chevy | DAY | ATL | LVS | MAR | DOV | KAN | CLT | TEX | IOW | GTW | CHI | KEN | ELD; 24 | POC | MCH | BRI | MSP | LVS | TAL | MAR | TEX | PHO | HOM | 75th | 13 | |
| 2021 | Jordan Anderson Racing | 3 | Chevy | DAY | DAY | LVS | ATL | BRI; Wth | RCH | KAN | DAR | COA | CLT | TEX | NSH | POC | KNX | GLN | GTW | DAR | BRI | LVS | TAL | MAR | PHO | | NA | – | |

^{*} Season still in progress
^{1} Ineligible for series points

=== ARCA Racing Series ===
(key) (Bold – Pole position awarded by qualifying time. Italics – Pole position earned by points standings or practice time. * – Most laps led.)

ARCA Racing Series results
| Year | Team | No. | Make | 1 | 2 | 3 | 4 | 5 | 6 | 7 | 8 | 9 | 10 | 11 | 12 | 13 | 14 | 15 | 16 | 17 | 18 | 19 | 20 | 21 | 22 | 23 | ARSC | Pts | Ref |
|---|---|---|---|---|---|---|---|---|---|---|---|---|---|---|---|---|---|---|---|---|---|---|---|---|---|---|---|---|---|
| 2007 | DGM Racing | 72 | Chevy | DAY; 35 | USA | NSH | SLM | KAN | WIN | KEN | TOL | IOW | POC | MCH | BLN | KEN | POC | NSH | ISF | MIL | GTW | DSF | CHI | SLM | TAL | TOL | 175th | 55 | |
| 2008 | Roulo Brothers Racing | 39 | Chevy | DAY; 16 | SLM | IOW | KAN | CAR | KEN | TOL | POC | MCH | CAY | | | | | | | | | | | | | | 77th | 300 | |
| 2008 | Darrell Basham Racing | 94 | Chevy | | | | | | | | | | | KEN; 16 | BLN | POC | NSH | ISF | DSF | CHI | SLM | NJE | TAL | TOL | | | 77th | 300 | |
| 2009 | BCR Racing | 74 | Chevy | DAY; DNQ | SLM | CAR | TAL; 27 | KEN; 30 | TOL | POC | MCH | MFD | IOW | KEN; 14 | BLN | POC | ISF | CHI; 16 | TOL | DSF | NJE | SLM | KAN | CAR | | | 60th | 510 | |
| 2011 | BCR Racing | 99 | Chevy | DAY | TAL | SLM | TOL | NJE | CHI | POC | MCH | WIN | BLN | IOW | IRP; 13 | POC | ISF | MAD | DSF | SLM | KAN | TOL | | | | | 106th | 165 | |
