= 2013 Mudsummer Classic =

Auto race held in 2013

Race details
- Race 10 of 22 in the 2013 NASCAR Camping World Truck Series season
- Date: July 24, 2013
- Official name: CarCash Mudsummer Classic presented by CNBC Prime's The Profit
- Location: Eldora Speedway, New Weston, Ohio
- Course: Permanent racing facility
- Course length: 0.5 miles (0.804 km)
- Distance: 153 laps, 76.5 mi (123.115 km)
- Scheduled distance: 150 laps, 75 mi (120.701 km)
- Weather: Mostly clear skies with temperatures hovering around 68.3 °F (20.2 °C); wind speeds reaching up to 14 miles per hour (23 km/h)
- Average speed: 67.401 mph (108.471 km/h)

Pole position
Driver	Ken Schrader	Ken Schrader Racing
- Time: 19.709 sec

Most laps led
Driver	Austin Dillon	Richard Childress Racing
- Laps: 64

Winner
No. 39	Austin Dillon	Richard Childress Racing

Television in the United States
- Network: Speed
- Announcers: Rick Allen, Phil Parsons, Michael Waltrip
- Nielsen ratings: 1.20 (1.4 million viewers)

The 2013 Mudsummer Classic (formally the CarCash Mudsummer Classic presented by CNBC Prime's The Profit) was a NASCAR Camping World Truck Series race held on July 24, 2013, at Eldora Speedway in New Weston, Ohio. The race was the first dirt track event held by a NASCAR national touring series (Cup, Xfinity, Trucks) since 1970. Contested over 153 laps, the race was the tenth of the 2013 NASCAR Camping World Truck Series season. Ken Schrader of self-owned Ken Schrader Racing won the pole position, and became the oldest pole sitter in NASCAR history at 58 years of age. Austin Dillon of Richard Childress Racing won the race, while Kyle Larson and Ryan Newman finished second and third, respectively.

The qualifying procedure for the race was unique compared to other NASCAR events; drivers' qualifying times set the starting grids for five heat races to determine the feature race's starting lineup, while the top five of a last chance qualifier (LCQ) advanced to the feature. Schrader, Jared Landers, Timothy Peters, Kenny Wallace and Jeb Burton won the heat races, while Brennan Newberry won the LCQ. The feature's format was also distinctive, as it was divided into three segments, lasting 60, 50 and 43 laps. In the feature, Larson took the lead from Peters on lap 39, and later battled with Dillon for the win. Dillon claimed the victory after he retained the lead on the green–white–checkered finish for his fifth career Truck Series win.

== Background ==
The last race run on dirt in a NASCAR national touring series occurred on September 30, 1970, at the North Carolina State Fairgrounds in Raleigh in a Grand National Series race, which was won by Richard Petty. Afterwards, NASCAR sanctioned the Busch All-Star Tour, a dirt late model series, which lasted from 1985 to 2002.

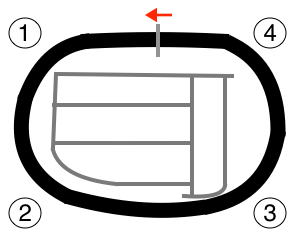
Eldora Speedway, where the race was held

Eldora Speedway, which opened in 1954, is a 0.5-mile (0.80-kilometre) oval with turns at a 24 degree banking, while the straightaways are banked at 8 degrees. The track's grandstands has a capacity of 17,782 spectators, while its hillside seating can fit an unlimited number of fans.

On October 15, 2012, track owner Tony Stewart and Austin Dillon held a private test at the track, driving trucks. On November 28, NASCAR announced that Eldora Speedway would be on the 2013 Truck Series schedule as the first of two Wednesday races, along with the UNOH 200 at Bristol Motor Speedway. Although the track does not have any SAFER barriers, Tom Gideon, NASCAR Director of Safety, stated the track meets NASCAR regulations. By January 29, 2013, the 17,782 grandstand seats had been sold out, with purchasers from 48 states and six countries.

"We've been looking at getting the trucks back to short tracks – to the roots of racing including the dirt – and we’re excited to announce our 2013 NASCAR Camping World Truck Series will race at Eldora Speedway in July. The door-to-door racing that our truck series is known for plus Eldora's popularity and [Tony Stewart]'s dedication to putting on great shows for the fans is a perfect fit. We'll have a maximum starting field of 30 trucks at Eldora. More details on the race format are still being developed."

— Steve O'Donnell, NASCAR senior vice president of racing operations

Various non-Truck Series regulars entered the race for reasons such as to help a team in the owners' championship, with teams hiring drivers who were familiar with dirt racing to assist them in the point standings. Examples include dirt track specialists Scott Bloomquist, who won The Dream and the World 100 at the track six times and three times, respectively; Tracy Hines, who had 85 career wins, including six at Eldora, and 52 starts in the Truck Series; Jared Landers, who won 100 features in his career; J. R. Heffner, who won the big-block modified championship at Lebanon Valley Speedway twice; Jeff Babcock, who won an American Late Model Series race at the track during 2013; and Joe Cobb, a dirt modified racer and the father of Truck Series regular Jennifer Jo Cobb. Cup Series drivers Dave Blaney, Ken Schrader and Ryan Newman, along with Nationwide Series drivers Austin Dillon, Kenny Wallace and Kyle Larson also ran in the event. Babcock, Blaney, Bloomquist, Hines, Schrader and Wallace had all won races at Eldora in various disciplines. Jason Bowles was later announced as the driver of the No. 5 for Wauters Motorsports, while Chris Jones was originally listed as the driver of the No. 93 for RSS Racing, but eventually withdrew.

In preparation for the race, tire provider Goodyear created new tires, branded "Wrangler", based on a previous dirt tire that the company made. To give the trucks more grip, the tires were widened by one inch to eleven. The bias-ply tires (instead of radial tires) also had treads to remove dirt quicker, in a block pattern, along with being softer. The left-side tires were staggered three inches shorter to 85.5 inches than the right tires (88.5) to assist in handling. Meanwhile, the trucks had mesh shields and hood deflector screens attached to prevent debris from the dirt from entering the radiators and damaging the vehicles. The trucks also had the front spoilers and splitters removed, the grille closed, and the rear spoilers raised and enlarged by 40 square inches to generate more downforce. The trucks' windshields remained, meaning the track crew had to keep the track dry, to prevent mud from making them unable to be cleared. On the hoods, bug deflectors, which were 8 by 12 inches, were installed to prevent stones from hitting the windshield. Teams added under panels to the trucks' chassis to prevent dirt from increasing the trucks' weight.

Entering the race, Matt Crafton led the points standings with 357 points, followed by Jeb Burton and James Buescher, both with 319 and 317 points, respectively. Ty Dillon and Johnny Sauter finished the top five with 309 and 305 points, respectively. Ryan Blaney had 290 points, and behind him were Miguel Paludo (285), Timothy Peters (281), Brendan Gaughan (280) and Bubba Wallace (272).

== Practice and qualifying ==
=== Practice ===
Two-hour practice sessions were held on July 23 from 4:30 to 6:30 P.M. EST, followed by another from 7:00 to 9:00 P.M, the latter being televised on Speed. Another practice was held the following day from 11:30 A.M. to 1:30 P.M.

Kyle Larson held the fastest lap time in the first practice session with a time of 19.645 seconds and speed of 91.626 mph (147.458 km/h), followed by father-son pair Dave (19.856 seconds, 91.653 mph (147.501 km/h)) and Ryan Blaney (19.918 seconds, 90.371 mph (145.438 km/h)) and brothers Austin (19.982 seconds, 90.081 mph (144.971 km/h)) and Ty Dillon (20.205 seconds, 89.087 mph (143.372 km/h)). The top five featured three Chevrolets and two Fords; the fastest Toyota driver was John Wes Townley (20.483 seconds, 87.878 mph (141.426 km/h)), who was seventh-fastest.

In the second session, the top five consisted of three Chevrolets in the top three positions and Toyotas in fourth and fifth: Austin (21.644 seconds, 83.164 mph (133.839 km/h)) and Ty Dillon (21.703 seconds, 82.938 mph (133.476 km/h)), Larson (21.719 seconds, 82.877 mph (133.378 km/h)), Ken Schrader (21.748 seconds, 82.766 mph (133.199 km/h)) and Tracy Hines (21.753 seconds, 82.747 mph (133.168 km/h)). The fastest Ford truck was Dave Blaney, with a lap time and speed of 21.872 seconds and 82.297 mph (132.444 km/h), respectively.

In the final practice, Toyotas dominated the top five, with Bubba Wallace leading the session with a time of 20.040 seconds and speed of 89.820 mph (144.551 km/h), followed by Hines (20.182 seconds, 89.188 mph (143.534 km/h)), Townley (20.303 seconds, 88.657 mph (142.680 km/h)) and Germán Quiroga (20.307 seconds, 88.639 mph (142.651 km/h)) comprising the top four; Chevy driver James Buescher (20.528 seconds, 87.685 mph (141.115 km/h)) was fifth.

=== Qualifying ===
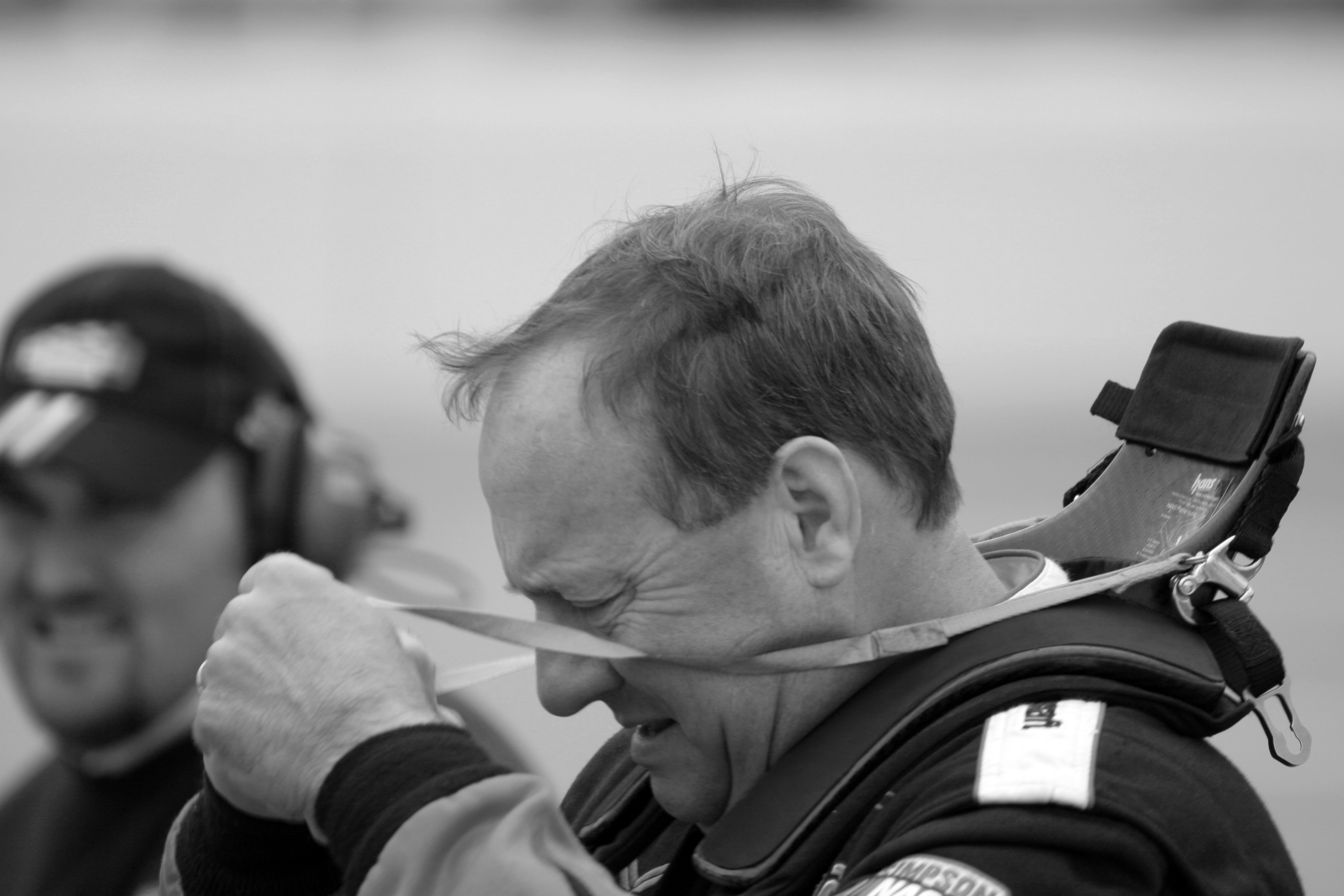
Ken Schrader (pictured in 2007) won the pole along with his heat race.

The field for the main event consisted only of 30 trucks instead of the usual 36, with the top 20 trucks in the owners' championship standings guaranteed a spot. To determine the field, two-lap qualifying runs were held, which determined the starting grids for five heat races of eight laps each. The top five fastest qualifiers started on the pole for the heats, and the highest non-locked-in truck were transferred in to the main event until there were 25 trucks in the field. For drivers that did not qualify via the heats, the top four in a last-chance qualifier advance, with the final spot reserved for the most recent series champion, and if that spot is vacant, the fifth-place finisher in the LCQ would qualify for the main event.

Qualifying was held at 5:05 P.M. Ken Schrader won the pole with a lap time of 19.709 seconds and a speed of 91.329 mph (146.980 km/h) for his first Truck Series pole since 2004, and became the oldest pole-sitter in NASCAR history at 58 years of age, passing Dick Trickle, who won the pole at Dover International Speedway in the Busch Series' MBNA Platinum 200 in 1999.

The heat races began at 7:00 P.M., with each heat race occurring after 15 minutes of the previous heat's start. The last chance qualifier was held at 8:45 P.M. Schrader eventually won his heat race after leading all 8 laps. In Heat 2, the first caution flag of the day was flown for Bubba Wallace's spin with three laps remaining, and Jared Landers prevented a comeback by Matt Crafton to win. The next heat was dominated by Timothy Peters, who led all eight laps; Heats 4 and 5 were won by Kenny Wallace and Jeb Burton, respectively, the two drivers leading every lap. In the last chance qualifier, J. R. Heffner, who started first in the race, failed to finish the race after completing one lap. Ultimately, Brennan Newberry led all fifteen laps to win, followed by Jeff Babcock, Jason Bowles and Justin Jennings. Norm Benning clinched the fifth and final transfer spot after holding off Clay Greenfield, who nearly wrecked him three times; in response, Benning gave Greenfield the finger after the race concluded. Because they did not finish in the top five, Greenfield, Jimmy Weller, Bryan Silas, Joe Cobb and Heffner did not qualify for the event. When asked about the duel with Greenfield, Benning stated Tony Stewart told him that he "singlehandedly made the show a success".

==== Qualifying results ====
Pos	No.	Driver	Team	Manufacturer	Time	Speed
1	52	Ken Schrader	Ken Schrader Racing	Toyota	19.709	91.329
2	6	Jared Landers	Eddie Sharp Racing	Chevrolet	19.804	90.891
3	17	Timothy Peters	Red Horse Racing	Toyota	19.869	90.593
4	81	Kenny Wallace	SS-Green Light Racing	Toyota	19.939	90.275
5	4	Jeb Burton #	Turner Scott Motorsports	Chevrolet	19.955	90.203
6	44	J. R. Heffner	74 Operations	Chevrolet	20.115	89.485
7	32	Miguel Paludo	Turner Scott Motorsports	Chevrolet	20.127	89.432
8	5	Jason Bowles	Wauters Motorsports	Chevrolet	20.138	89.383
9	8	Max Gresham	Eddie Sharp Racing	Chevrolet	20.266	88.819
10	98	Johnny Sauter	ThorSport Racing	Toyota	20.280	88.757
11	18	Joey Coulter	Kyle Busch Motorsports	Toyota	20.300	88.670
12	88	Matt Crafton	ThorSport Racing	Toyota	20.337	88.509
13	68	Clay Greenfield	Clay Greenfield Motorsports	Ram	20.343	88.483
14	34	Ryan Newman (i)	Turner Scott Motorsports	Chevrolet	20.421	88.145
15	39	Austin Dillon (i)	Richard Childress Racing	Chevrolet	20.423	88.136
16	07	Jimmy Weller	SS-Green Light Racing	Chevrolet	20.453	88.007
17	54	Bubba Wallace	Kyle Busch Motorsports	Toyota	20.465	87.995
18	62	Brendan Gaughan	Richard Childress Racing	Chevrolet	20.520	87.719
19	31	James Buescher	Turner Scott Motorsports	Chevrolet	20.521	87.715
20	63	Justin Jennings	MB Motorsports	Ford	20.530	87.677
21	84	Jeff Babcock	Chris Fontaine Racing	Chevrolet	20.543	87.621
22	13	Tracy Hines	ThorSport Racing	Toyota	20.544	87.617
23	30	Kyle Larson	Turner Scott Motorsports	Chevrolet	20.594	87.404
24	7	John Wes Townley	Red Horse Racing	Toyota	20.618	87.302
25	99	Bryan Silas	T3R Motorsports	Ford	20.630	87.252
26	19	Dave Blaney (i)	Brad Keselowski Racing	Ford	20.673	87.070
27	57	Norm Benning	Norm Benning Racing	Chevrolet	20.677	87.053
28	24	Brennan Newberry	NTS Motorsports	Chevrolet	20.714	86.898
29	9	Ron Hornaday Jr.	NTS Motorsports	Chevrolet	20.715	86.894
30	3	Ty Dillon	Richard Childress Racing	Chevrolet	20.719	86.877
31	51	Scott Bloomquist	Kyle Busch Motorsports	Toyota	20.730	86.831
32	29	Ryan Blaney #	Brad Keselowski Racing	Ford	20.856	86.306
33	60	Dakoda Armstrong	Turn One Racing	Chevrolet	20.856	86.306
34	10	Joe Cobb	JJC Racing	Ram	20.914	86.067
35	77	Germán Quiroga #	Red Horse Racing	Toyota	21.122	85.219

Key	Meaning
#	Rookie
(i)	Ineligible for series points
Italic	Required to qualify on speed

===== Heat races =====
====== Heat Race #1 ======
Pos	Grid	No.	Driver	Team	Manufacturer
1	1	52	Ken Schrader	Ken Schrader Racing	Toyota
2	2	44	J. R. Heffner	74 Operations	Chevrolet
3	6	19	Dave Blaney	Brad Keselowski Racing	Ford
4	3	18	Joey Coulter	Kyle Busch Motorsports	Toyota
5	5	13	Tracy Hines	ThorSport Racing	Toyota
6	4	07	Jimmy Weller	SS-Green Light Racing	Chevrolet
7	7	51	Scott Bloomquist	Kyle Busch Motorsports	Toyota

====== Heat Race #2 ======
Pos	Grid	No.	Driver	Team	Manufacturer
1	1	6	Jared Landers	Eddie Sharp Racing	Chevrolet
2	3	88	Matt Crafton	ThorSport Racing	Toyota
3	2	32	Miguel Paludo	Turner Scott Motorsports	Chevrolet
4	4	54	Bubba Wallace	Kyle Busch Motorsports	Toyota
5	5	84	Jeff Babcock	Chris Fontaine Racing	Chevrolet
6	7	60	Dakoda Armstrong	Turn One Racing	Chevrolet
7	7	57	Norm Benning	Norm Benning Racing	Chevrolet

====== Heat Race #3 ======
Pos	Grid	No.	Driver	Team	Manufacturer
1	1	17	Timothy Peters	Red Horse Racing	Toyota
2	4	62	Brendan Gaughan	Richard Childress Racing	Chevrolet
3	5	30	Kyle Larson	Turner Scott Motorsports	Chevrolet
4	2	5	Jason Bowles	Wauters Motorsports	Chevrolet
5	6	9	Ron Hornaday Jr.	NTS Motorsports	Chevrolet
6	7	29	Ryan Blaney	Brad Keselowski Racing	Ford
7	3	68	Clay Greenfield	Clay Greenfield Motorsports	Ram

====== Heat Race #4 ======
Pos	Grid	No.	Driver	Team	Manufacturer
1	1	81	Kenny Wallace	SS-Green Light Racing	Toyota
2	4	31	James Buescher	Turner Scott Motorsports	Chevrolet
3	2	8	Max Gresham	Eddie Sharp Racing	Chevrolet
4	3	39	Austin Dillon	Richard Childress Racing	Chevrolet
5	6	24	Brennan Newberry	NTS Motorsports	Chevrolet
6	5	7	John Wes Townley	Red Horse Racing	Toyota
7	7	10	Joe Cobb	JJC Racing	Ram

====== Heat Race #5 ======
Pos	Grid	No.	Driver	Team	Manufacturer
1	1	4	Jeb Burton	Turner Scott Motorsports	Chevrolet
2	3	34	Ryan Newman	Turner Scott Motorsports	Chevrolet
3	6	3	Ty Dillon	Richard Childress Racing	Chevrolet
4	2	98	Johnny Sauter	ThorSport Racing	Toyota
5	7	77	Germán Quiroga	Red Horse Racing	Toyota
6	4	63	Justin Jennings	MB Motorsports	Ford
7	5	99	Bryan Silas	T3R Motorsports	Ford

==== Last Chance Qualifier ====
Pos	Grid	No.	Driver	Team	Manufacturer
1	4	24	Brennan Newberry	NTS Motorsports	Chevrolet
2	2	84	Jeff Babcock	Chris Fontaine Racing	Chevrolet
3	3	5	Jason Bowles	Wauters Motorsports	Chevrolet
4	5	63	Justin Jennings	MB Motorsports	Ford
5	7	57	Norm Benning	Norm Benning Racing	Chevrolet
6	8	68	Clay Greenfield	Clay Greenfield Motorsports	Ram
7	6	07	Jimmy Weller	SS-Green Light Racing	Chevrolet
8	10	99	Bryan Silas	T3R Motorsports	Ford
9	9	10	Joe Cobb	JJC Racing	Ram
10	1	44	J. R. Heffner	74 Operations	Chevrolet

== Race ==
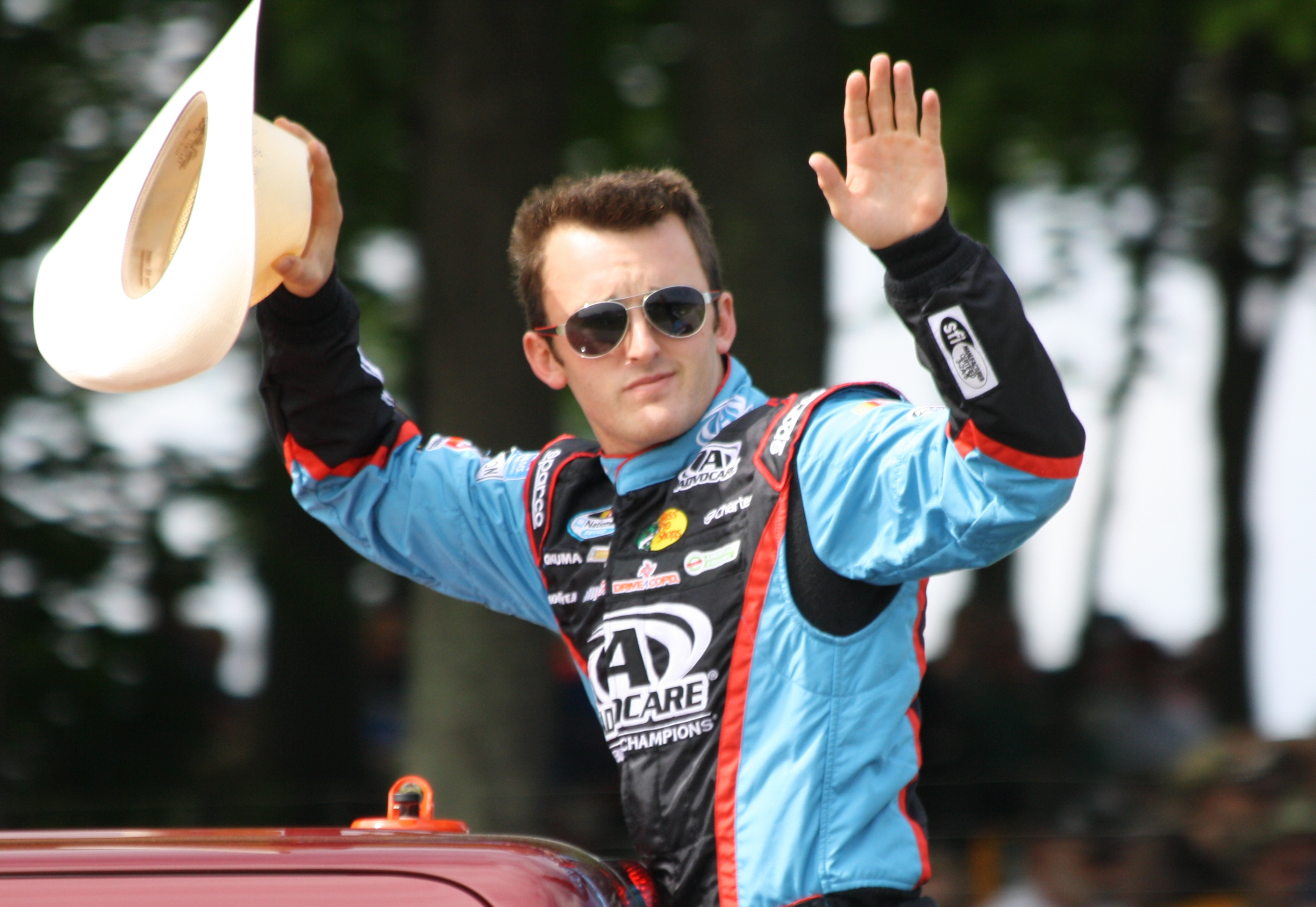
In Victory Lane, race winner Austin Dillon (pictured in 2013) stated, "This is real racing right here, this is all I've got to say."

The race started at 9:35 P.M. EST and televised live on Speed, while being broadcast on radio by Motor Racing Network. Krista Voda hosted Speed's prerace show, while Rick Allen, Phil Parsons and Michael Waltrip called the race from the booth; the network's pit reporters for the event were Ray Dunlap, Hermie Sadler and Bob Dillner. 1.4 million people viewed the race on television, the tenth-most viewed Truck race in series history, and the highest-watched event of the day; the race also had a Nielsen rating of 1.20. The weather for the race was mostly clear with a temperature of 68 °F (20 °C). The St. Henry High School band performed the national anthem, while the parade lap featured a four-wide salute by the trucks to the fans.

Due to the lack of a pit road, the race was split into three segments of 60, 50 and 40 laps so teams could make pit stops and adjustments between each segment, and there would be no positions gained nor lost during stops. In segment 1, Timothy Peters took the lead from pole-sitter Ken Schrader on lap 15, and led for 23 laps until Kyle Larson took the lead on lap 39, who led for the remainder of the segment. In the final five laps of the segment, the first caution of the race flew for debris, and the beneficiary was Max Gresham, who was the first driver at least a lap down, which allowed him to regain a lap. In the second segment, Larson continued to lead for a total of 50 laps until Austin Dillon passed him on lap 89 after the former collided with Germán Quiroga. One lap later, another caution was flown for debris, and Gresham was again the beneficiary. On lap 116, Jared Landers' truck became loose in turn 2, collected Ty Dillon and made contact with Johnny Sauter. Quiroga was the beneficiary on the resulting caution. Larson and Austin Dillon dueled for the remainder of the race, with Dillon allowing Larson to pass on lap 122, but Dillon managed to get past Larson on the following lap. Two more cautions for debris (first on the front stretch, the second in turn 4) were eventually flown, and a green–white–checkered finish was initiated due to debris in turn 4 on lap 149. Dillon retained the lead on the GWC to win, beating Larson by 1.197 seconds. Behind Dillon and Larson, Ryan Newman finished third, followed by Joey Coulter, Brendan Gaughan, Timothy Peters, Bubba Wallace, Matt Crafton, Dave Blaney and Max Gresham. Sauter (accident) and Jeff Babcock (engine) failed to finish the race.

The race concluded with four different leaders, eight lead changes, and six cautions. Dillon led the most laps with 64, followed by Larson (51), Peters (23) and Schrader (15). Despite winning the race, Dillon, along with six other drivers, did not receive Truck Series points due to a rule that allowed drivers to compete in the drivers' championship for only one of NASCAR's three national touring series. The win was Dillon's first of 2013 and fifth Truck Series victory in 53 starts. It was also the 29th Truck Series win for owner Richard Childress and Richard Childress Racing's second Truck win of 2013.

In August, Dillon's truck, his winner's trophy and a jar of dirt he shoveled at the start/finish line were placed on display in the NASCAR Hall of Fame.

== Results ==
Pos	Grid	No.	Driver	Team	Manufacturer	Laps	Points
1	19	39	Austin Dillon	Richard Childress Racing	Chevrolet	153	0
2	13	30	Kyle Larson	Turner Scott Motorsports	Chevrolet	153	0
3	10	34	Ryan Newman	Turner Scott Motorsports	Chevrolet	153	0
4	11	18	Joey Coulter	Kyle Busch Motorsports	Toyota	153	40
5	8	62	Brendan Gaughan	Richard Childress Racing	Chevrolet	153	39
6	3	17	Timothy Peters	Red Horse Racing	Toyota	153	39
7	17	54	Bubba Wallace #	Kyle Busch Motorsports	Toyota	153	37
8	7	88	Matt Crafton	ThorSport Racing	Toyota	153	36
9	6	19	Dave Blaney	Brad Keselowski Racing	Ford	153	0
10	14	8	Max Gresham	Eddie Sharp Racing	Chevrolet	153	34
11	22	60	Dakoda Armstrong	Turn One Racing	Chevrolet	153	33
12	2	6	Jared Landers	Eddie Sharp Racing	Chevrolet	153	32
13	16	13	Tracy Hines	ThorSport Racing	Toyota	153	31
14	1	52	Ken Schrader	Ken Schrader Racing	Toyota	153	0
15	23	29	Ryan Blaney #	Brad Keselowski Racing	Ford	153	29
16	15	3	Ty Dillon	Richard Childress Racing	Chevrolet	153	28
17	4	81	Kenny Wallace	SS-Green Light Racing	Toyota	153	0
18	5	4	Jeb Burton #	Turner Scott Motorsports	Chevrolet	153	26
19	9	31	James Buescher	Turner Scott Motorsports	Chevrolet	153	25
20	25	77	Germán Quiroga #	Red Horse Racing	Toyota	153	24
21	12	32	Miguel Paludo	Turner Scott Motorsports	Chevrolet	153	23
22	24	7	John Wes Townley	Red Horse Racing	Toyota	152	22
23	29	63	Justin Jennings	MB Motorsports	Ford	151	21
24	28	5	Jason Bowles	Wauters Motorsports	Chevrolet	151	0
25	21	51	Scott Bloomquist	Kyle Busch Motorsports	Toyota	151	19
26	30	57	Norm Benning	Norm Benning Racing	Chevrolet	149	18
27	26	24	Brennan Newberry #	NTS Motorsports	Chevrolet	145	17
28	18	9	Ron Hornaday Jr.	NTS Motorsports	Chevrolet	137	16
29	20	98	Johnny Sauter	ThorSport Racing	Toyota	120	15
30	27	84	Jeff Babcock	Chris Fontaine Racing	Chevrolet	63	14
# Rookie of the Year candidate Source:

=== Standings after the race ===
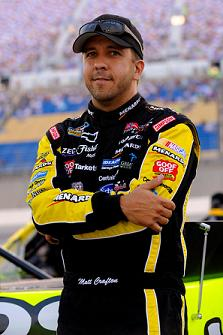
After the race, Matt Crafton (pictured in 2011) remained in the points lead with 393.

	Pos	Driver	Points
	1	Matt Crafton	393
	2	Jeb Burton	345 (−48)
	3	James Buescher	342 (−51)
	4	Ty Dillon	337 (−56)
	5	Johnny Sauter	320 (−73)
2	6	Timothy Peters	320 (−73)
1	7	Ryan Blaney	319 (−74)
1	8	Brendan Gaughan	319 (−74)
1	9	Bubba Wallace	309 (−84)
3	10	Miguel Paludo	308 (−85)
