= Eldora Dirt Derby =

Auto race held in Rossburg, United States

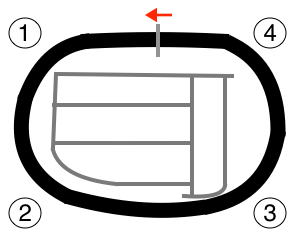

NASCAR Gander RV & Outdoors Truck Series
- Venue: Eldora Speedway
- Location: Rossburg, Ohio, United States
- First race: 2013
- Last race: 2019
- Distance: 75-mile-long (121 km)
- Laps: Qualifying Races (5): 10 laps (Only green flag laps counted); Last Chance Race: 15 laps (Only green flag laps counted); Feature (Main Event): 150 laps (in segments of 40, 50, and 60 laps)
- Previous names: 1-800 CarCash Mudsummer Classic (2013–2015); Aspen Dental Eldora Dirt Derby (2016)
- Most wins (team): Kyle Busch Motorsports; ThorSport Racing (2)
- Most wins (manufacturer): Toyota; Chevrolet (3)

Circuit information
- Surface: Clay
- Length: 0.5 mi (0.80 km)
- Turns: 4

The Eldora Dirt Derby was a 75-mile-long (121 km) annual race in the NASCAR Gander RV & Outdoors Truck Series race held at Eldora Speedway in Rossburg, Ohio. During its existence from 2013 to 2019, the race was the only dirt track racing event on any NASCAR national touring series (Cup, Xfinity, or Truck) schedule and the first since 1970. Due to coronavirus concerns in 2020, the race was not run and is not scheduled to be run again in the Truck Series. The standalone dirt event was later moved to Knoxville Raceway for 2021.

== History ==
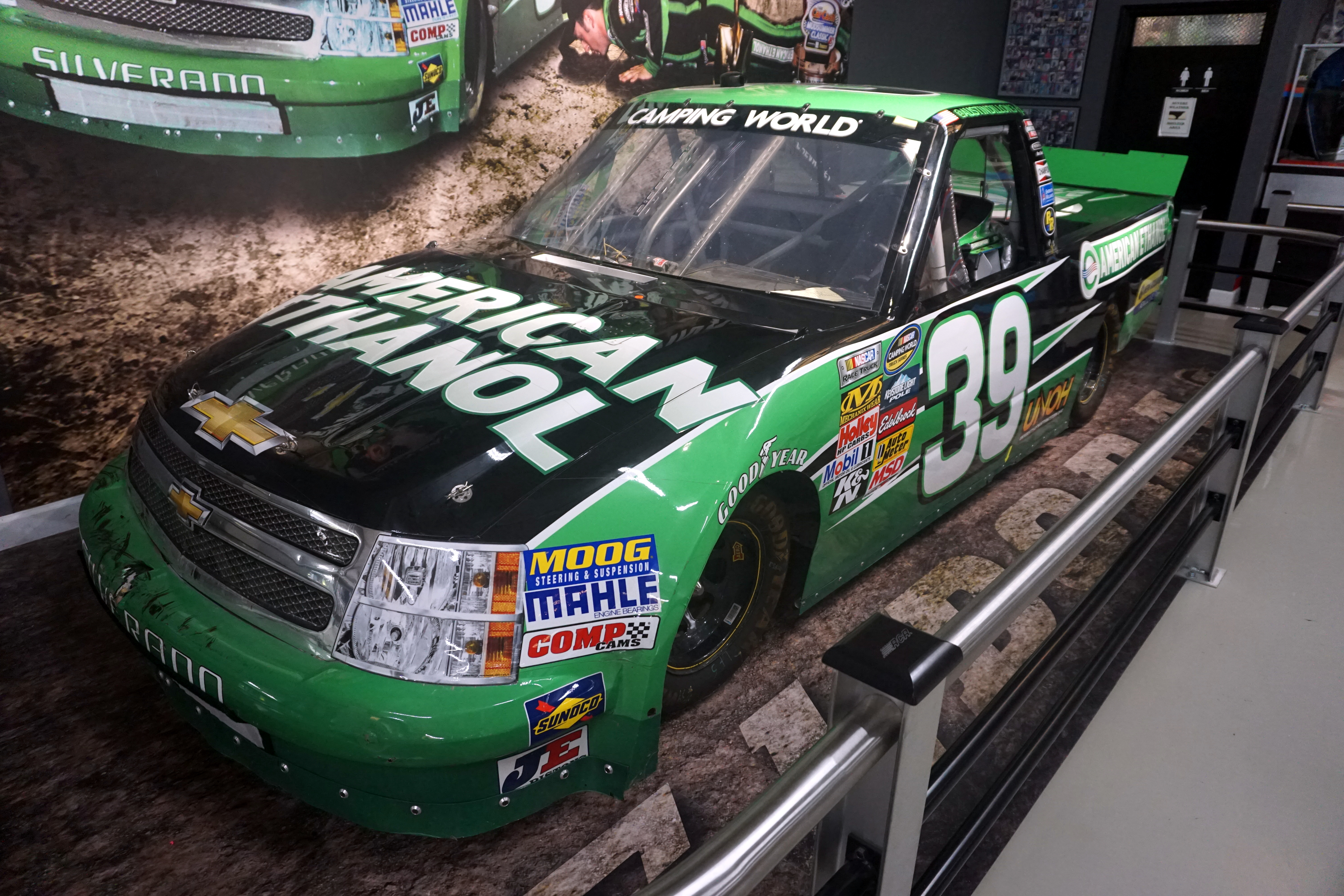
Austin Dillon's 2013 Eldora Speedway-winning No. 39 American Ethanol Chevrolet Silverado

On November 28, 2012, NASCAR announced the addition of a race at Eldora Speedway to the 2013 NASCAR Camping World Truck Series's schedule. The race would be the first on a dirt surface in any of NASCAR's national series since 1970, with the last being at the North Carolina State Fairgrounds in Raleigh, North Carolina.

The inaugural running of the event, which completely sold out in January 2013, was run on July 24, 2013. Austin Dillon won the event after retaining the lead on a green–white–checkered finish.

The event was originally branded as the Mudsummer Classic, but was renamed for the 2016 edition due to a trademark dispute with Major League Baseball, as the league's All-Star Game is marketed with the trademark "Midsummer Classic". The event was ultimately renamed the Eldora Dirt Derby, with the 2016 edition being sponsored by Aspen Dental.

The 2020 race was canceled due to state restrictions on large gatherings as a safety measure against the COVID-19 pandemic. The Derby was removed from the schedule in 2021.

== Format ==
There are five qualifying races, consisting of ten laps each, that determine the starting grid. However, driver's starting positions in the qualifying races are determined by normal two-lap qualifying sessions. Caution laps in the qualifying races are not scored, and five trucks will transfer from each qualifying race. After the five races, a total of 25 trucks will have qualified for the feature (the main event). Another race, named the 'Last Chance Race', consists of 15 laps, and determines the lineup from position 26 to 29. The final position on the grid is awarded to the most recent Camping World Truck Series champion, unless there is no beneficiary to that position. In that case, the fifth-place finisher in the 'Last Chance Race' is awarded the final starting position. The main event, or feature, is 150 laps long, with three segments of 40, 50 and 60 laps. During each break, drivers are allowed to make pit stops.

In 2014, the format was changed. Instead of lasting eight laps, the heat races will now consist of ten laps, with the top five teams failing to qualify for the Main Feature being awarded owners' points. Additionally, drivers are no longer required to pit.

Following the abolition of the "all exempt" tour format in 2015, the last chance format changed. Only the top drivers advance to the feature from the Last Chance race, for a net of 27 cars. The remaining five trucks in the field will be filled by NASCAR's provisional starting regulations; trucks in the top four in owner points standings that have not qualified for the race, and then the most recent Truck Series driver champion not in the field if necessary, or if not, the fifth-place truck in owner points standings of those not qualified.

== Past winners ==
=== Qualifying races ===
Year	Date	Race	No.	Driver	Team	Manufacturer	Race Distance		Race Time	Average Speed (mph)	Ref
Year	Date	Race	No.	Driver	Team	Manufacturer	Laps	Miles (km)	Race Time	Average Speed (mph)	Ref
2013	July 24	1	52	Ken Schrader	Ken Schrader Racing	Toyota	8	4 (6.437)	0:02:52	83.941	
2013	July 24	2	6	Jared Landers	Eddie Sharp Racing	Chevrolet	8	4 (6.437)	0:03:12	75.767	
2013	July 24	3	17	Timothy Peters	Red Horse Racing	Toyota	8	4 (6.437)	0:02:52	83.47	
2013	July 24	4	81	Kenny Wallace	SS-Green Light Racing	Toyota	8	4 (6.437)	0:02:56	82.245	
2013	July 24	5	4	Jeb Burton	Turner Scott Motorsports	Chevrolet	8	4 (6.437)	0:02:55	82.296	
2014	July 23	1	51	Erik Jones	Kyle Busch Motorsports	Toyota	10	5 (8.046)	0:03.35	83.867	
2014	July 23	2	13	Jeb Burton	ThorSport Racing	Toyota	10	5 (8.046)	0:03:37	83.209	
2014	July 23	3	30	Ron Hornaday Jr.	Turner Scott Motorsports	Chevrolet	10	5 (8.046)	0:03:36	83.509	
2014	July 23	4	29	Ryan Blaney	Brad Keselowski Racing	Ford	10	5 (8.046)	0:03:32	84.032	
2014	July 23	5	98	Johnny Sauter	ThorSport Racing	Toyota	10	5 (8.046)	0:03:50	78.375	
2015	July 22	1	63	Bobby Pierce	MB Motorsports	Chevrolet	10	5 (8.046)	0:04:03	73.672	
2015	July 22	2	8	John Hunter Nemechek	SWM-NEMCO Motorsports	Chevrolet	10	5 (8.046)	0:03:46	79.657	
2015	July 22	3	52	Ken Schrader	Ken Schrader Racing	Toyota	10	5 (8.046)	0:04:35	65.028	
2015	July 22	4	54	Christopher Bell	Kyle Busch Motorsports	Toyota	10	5 (8.046)	0:03:59	74.779	
2015	July 22	5	19	Tyler Reddick	Brad Keselowski Racing	Ford	10	5 (8.046)	0:03:46	80.06	
2016	July 20	1	63	Bobby Pierce	MB Motorsports	Chevrolet	10	5 (8.046)	0:03:41	81.680	
2016	July 20	2	29	Tyler Reddick	Brad Keselowski Racing	Ford	10	5 (8.046)	0:03:23	88.709	
2016	July 20	3	71	Ken Schrader	Contreras Motorsports	Toyota	10	5 (8.046)	0:03:57	76.607	
2016	July 20	4	44	J. R. Heffner	Martins Motorsports	Chevrolet	10	5 (8.046)	0:03:31	85.606	
2016	July 20	5	41	Ben Rhodes	ThorSport Racing	Toyota	10	5 (8.046)	0:03:26	87.138	
2017	July 19	1	52	Stewart Friesen	Halmar Friesen Racing	Chevrolet	10	5 (8.046)	0:03:29	86.673	
2017	July 19	2	88	Matt Crafton	ThorSport Racing	Toyota	10	5 (8.046)	0:03:29	86.316	
2017	July 19	3	33	Kaz Grala	GMS Racing	Chevrolet	10	5 (8.046)	0:03:28	86.678	
2017	July 19	4	4	Christopher Bell	Kyle Busch Motorsports	Toyota	10	5 (8.046)	0:03:32	86.946	
2017	July 19	5	99	Ty Dillon	MDM Motorsports	Chevrolet	10	5 (8.046)	0:03:30	85.463	
2018	July 18	1	41	Ben Rhodes	ThorSport Racing	Ford	10	5 (8.046)	0:04:11	71.764	
2018	July 18	2	4	Todd Gilliland	Kyle Busch Motorsports	Toyota	10	5 (8.046)	0:03:29	86.283	
2018	July 18	3	27	Chase Briscoe	ThorSport Racing	Ford	10	5 (8.046)	0:03:23	88.513	
2018	July 18	4	88	Matt Crafton	ThorSport Racing	Ford	10	5 (8.046)	0:03:27	87.535	
2018	July 18	5	52	Stewart Friesen	Halmar Friesen Racing	Chevrolet	10	5 (8.046)	0:03:29	86.187	
2019	August 1	1	27	Chase Briscoe	ThorSport Racing	Ford	10	5 (8.046)	N/A	N/A	
2019	August 1	2	88	Matt Crafton	ThorSport Racing	Ford	10	5 (8.046)	N/A	N/A	
2019	August 1	3	24	Brett Moffitt	GMS Racing	Chevrolet	10	5 (8.046)	N/A	N/A	
2019	August 1	4	52	Stewart Friesen	Halmar Friesen Racing	Chevrolet	10	5 (8.046)	N/A	N/A	
2019	August 1	5	54	Kyle Strickler	DGR-Crosley	Toyota	10	5 (8.046)	N/A	N/A	
2020*	Not held										

=== "Last Chance" qualifying race ===
Year	Date	No.	Driver	Team	Manufacturer	Race Distance		Race Time	Average Speed (mph)	Ref
Year	Date	No.	Driver	Team	Manufacturer	Laps	Miles (km)	Race Time	Average Speed (mph)	Ref
2013	July 24	24	Brennan Newberry	NTS Motorsports	Chevrolet	15	7.5 (12.07)	0:05:53	78.005	
2014	July 23	05	John Wes Townley	Athenian Motorsports	Toyota	15	7.5 (12.07)	0:06:57	64.729	
2015	July 22	35	Cody Erickson	Empire Racing	Chevrolet	15	7.5 (12.07)	0:05:44	78.263	
2016	July 20	51	Cody Coughlin	Kyle Busch Motorsports	Toyota	15	7.5 (12.07)	0:05:21	84.202	
2017	July 19	63	Bobby Pierce	MB Motorsports	Chevrolet	15	7.5 (12.07)	0:05:27	82.737	
2018	July 18	8	John Hunter Nemechek	NEMCO Motorsports	Chevrolet	15	7.5 (12.07)	0:06:19	71.457	
2019	August 1	17	Tyler Ankrum	DGR-Crosley	Toyota	15	7.5 (12.07)	N/A	N/A	
2020*	Not held									

=== Feature (Main Event) ===
Year	Date	No.	Driver	Team	Manufacturer	Race Distance		Race Time	Average Speed (mph)	Report	Ref
Year	Date	No.	Driver	Team	Manufacturer	Laps	Miles (km)	Race Time	Average Speed (mph)	Report	Ref
2013	July 24	39	Austin Dillon	Richard Childress Racing	Chevrolet	153*	76.5 (123.114)	1:08:06	67.401	Report	
2014	July 23	54	Bubba Wallace	Kyle Busch Motorsports	Toyota	150	75 (120.701)	1:29:39	50.195	Report	
2015	July 22	54	Christopher Bell	Kyle Busch Motorsports	Toyota	153*	76.5 (123.114)	1:43:35	44.602	Report	
2016	July 20	24	Kyle Larson	GMS Racing	Chevrolet	150	75 (120.701)	1:47:13	41.971	Report	
2017	July 19	88	Matt Crafton	ThorSport Racing	Toyota	150	75 (120.701)	1:45:44	42.56	Report	
2018	July 18	27	Chase Briscoe	ThorSport Racing	Ford	153*	76.5 (123.114)	1:39:30	46.131	Report	
2019	August 1	52	Stewart Friesen	Halmar Friesen Racing	Chevrolet	150	75 (120.701)	1:49:06	41.247	Report	
2020*	Not held										

- 2013, 2015 and 2018: The race was extended due to a NASCAR Overtime finish.
- 2020: Race cancelled and moved to Kansas due to the COVID-19 pandemic.

=== Multiple Feature winners (teams) ===
# Wins	Team	Years won
2	Kyle Busch Motorsports	2014, 2015
2	ThorSport Racing	2017, 2018

=== Manufacturer wins ===
# Wins	Make	Years won
3	(Japan) Toyota	2014, 2015, 2017
3	(United States) Chevrolet	2013, 2016, 2019
1	(United States) Ford	2018

== Tuesday Night Tailgate ==
The Tuesday Night Tailgate is the supporting event to the Mudsummer Classic featuring pre-race technical inspection for the Truck Series teams. From 2014 to 2015, the event included the Sunoco American Late Model Series. In 2016, the event will feature the Super DIRTcar Series Big Block Modifieds, which will return to Eldora for the first time since 2006.

=== Past winners ===
Year	Date	Race Name	Driver	Race Distance		Ref
Year	Date	Race Name	Driver	Laps	Miles (km)	Ref
Sunoco American Late Model Series
2014	July 22	Tuesday Night Tailgate	Steve Casebolt	25	12.5 (20.1)	
2015	July 21	Tuesday Night Tailgate	Jeep VanWormer	25	12.5 (20.1)	
Super DIRTcar Series Big Block Modifieds
2016	July 20	Tuesday Night Tailgate	Tim Fuller			
2017	July 18	Dirt Derby 75	Billy Decker	75	37.5 (60.375)	
