= 2021 NASCAR All-Star Race =

37th iteration of the NASCAR All-Star Race

Race details
- Date: June 13, 2021
- Location: Texas Motor Speedway in Fort Worth, Texas
- Course: Permanent racing facility 1.5 mi (2.4 km)
- Distance: Open: 50 laps, 75 mi (121 km); Stage 1: 20 laps Stage 2: 20 laps Stage 3: 10 laps All-Star Race: 100 Laps, 150 mi (240 km); Stage 1: 15 laps Stage 2: 15 laps Stage 3: 15 laps Stage 4: 15 laps Stage 5: 30 laps Stage 6: 10 laps
- Avg Speed: Open: 94.67 mph (152.36 km/h); All-Star Race: 84.919 mph (136.664 km/h)

NASCAR All Star Open
- Pole: Tyler Reddick (Richard Childress Racing)
- Time: N/A
- Winner (segment 1): Ross Chastain (Chip Ganassi Racing)
- Winner (segment 2): Tyler Reddick (Richard Childress Racing)
- Winner (segment 3): Aric Almirola (Stewart Haas Racing)
- Fan Vote winners: Matt DiBenedetto (Wood Brothers Racing)

NASCAR All-Star Race
- Pole: Kyle Larson (Hendrick Motorsports)
- Time: N/A
- Most laps led: William Byron (Hendrick Motorsports)
- Laps led: 30
- Winner: Kyle Larson (Hendrick Motorsports)

Television
- Network: FS1
- Announcers: Mike Joy, Jeff Gordon and Clint Bowyer

Radio
- Network: Motor Racing Network
- Announcers: Alex Hayden and Jeff Striegle (Booth); Dave Moody (1 & 2); Mike Bagley (3 & 4) (Turns)

The 2021 NASCAR All-Star Race (XXXVII) was a NASCAR Cup Series stock car exhibition race held on June 13, 2021, at Texas Motor Speedway in Fort Worth, Texas. Contested over 100 laps, it was the second exhibition race of the 2021 NASCAR Cup Series season.

== Report ==
=== Background ===
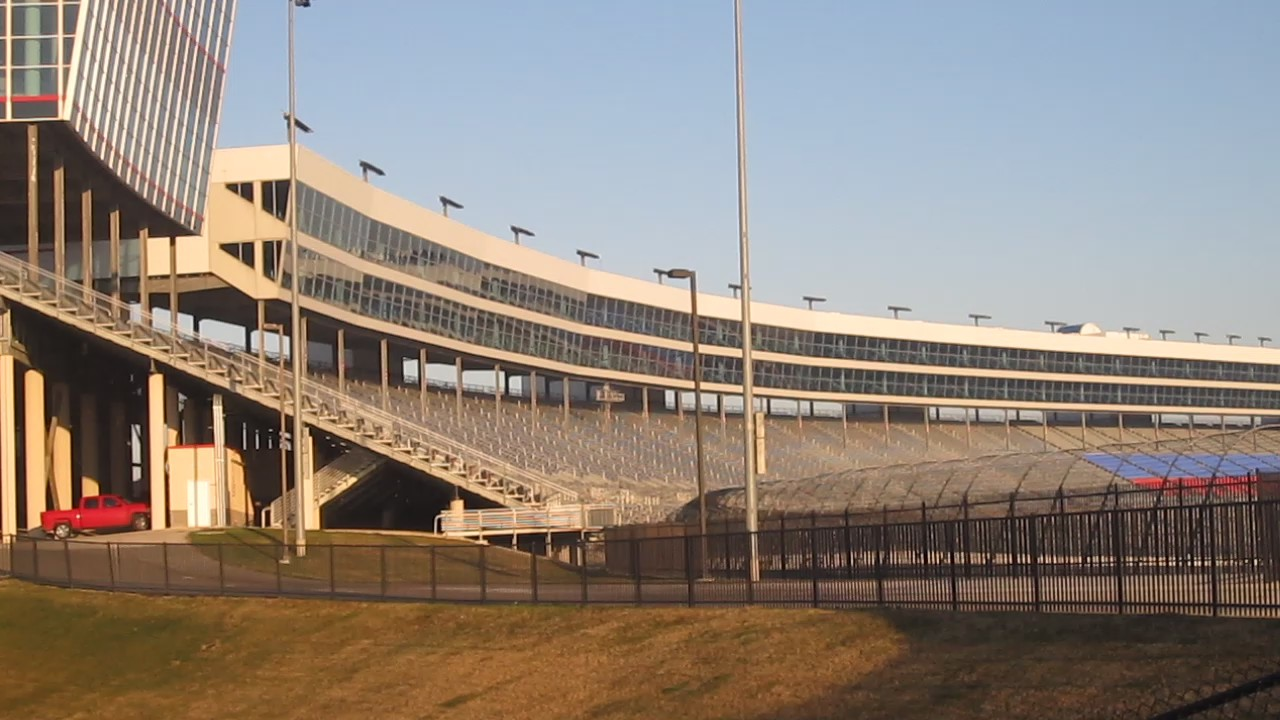
Texas Motor Speedway

The 2021 NASCAR All-Star Race program cover, made by Learfield IMG College.

The All-Star Race is open to race winners from last season through the 2021 Toyota/Save Mart 350 at Sonoma Raceway, all previous All-Star race winners, NASCAR Cup champions who had attempted to qualify for every race in 2021, the winner of each stage of the All-Star Open, and the winner of the All-Star fan vote are eligible to compete in the All-Star Race.

In 2020, the race was moved to Bristol Motor Speedway in July, as the COVID-19 pandemic prevented Charlotte from accommodating fans. The venue changed again in 2021 to Texas Motor Speedway, which replaced its spring date with the All-Star Race.

==== Entry list ====
- (R) denotes rookie driver.
- (i) denotes driver who is ineligible for series driver points.

===== NASCAR All Star Open =====
No.	Driver	Team	Manufacturer
00	Quin Houff	StarCom Racing	Chevrolet
7	Corey LaJoie	Spire Motorsports	Chevrolet
8	Tyler Reddick	Richard Childress Racing	Chevrolet
10	Aric Almirola	Stewart-Haas Racing	Ford
13	David Starr (i)	MBM Motorsports	Toyota
14	Chase Briscoe (R)	Stewart-Haas Racing	Ford
15	James Davison	Rick Ware Racing	Chevrolet
17	Chris Buescher	Roush Fenway Racing	Ford
21	Matt DiBenedetto	Wood Brothers Racing	Ford
23	Bubba Wallace	23XI Racing	Toyota
33	Austin Cindric (i)	Team Penske	Ford
38	Anthony Alfredo (R)	Front Row Motorsports	Ford
42	Ross Chastain	Chip Ganassi Racing	Chevrolet
43	Erik Jones	Richard Petty Motorsports	Chevrolet
47	Ricky Stenhouse Jr.	JTG Daugherty Racing	Chevrolet
51	Cody Ware (i)	Petty Ware Racing	Chevrolet
52	Josh Bilicki	Rick Ware Racing	Ford
53	Garrett Smithley (i)	Rick Ware Racing	Chevrolet
66	Timmy Hill (i)	MBM Motorsports	Toyota
77	Justin Haley (i)	Spire Motorsports	Chevrolet
78	B. J. McLeod (i)	Live Fast Motorsports	Ford
99	Daniel Suárez	Trackhouse Racing Team	Chevrolet
Official entry list

===== NASCAR All-Star Race =====
No.	Driver	Team	Manufacturer
1	Kurt Busch	Chip Ganassi Racing	Chevrolet
2	Brad Keselowski	Team Penske	Ford
3	Austin Dillon	Richard Childress Racing	Chevrolet
4	Kevin Harvick	Stewart-Haas Racing	Ford
5	Kyle Larson	Hendrick Motorsports	Chevrolet
6	Ryan Newman	Roush Fenway Racing	Ford
9	Chase Elliott	Hendrick Motorsports	Chevrolet
11	Denny Hamlin	Joe Gibbs Racing	Toyota
12	Ryan Blaney	Team Penske	Ford
18	Kyle Busch	Joe Gibbs Racing	Toyota
19	Martin Truex Jr.	Joe Gibbs Racing	Toyota
20	Christopher Bell	Joe Gibbs Racing	Toyota
22	Joey Logano	Team Penske	Ford
24	William Byron	Hendrick Motorsports	Chevrolet
34	Michael McDowell	Front Row Motorsports	Ford
41	Cole Custer	Stewart-Haas Racing	Ford
48	Alex Bowman	Hendrick Motorsports	Chevrolet
Official entry list

== Qualifying (Open) ==
Tyler Reddick was awarded the pole for the open as it was determined by current driver points.

=== Open Starting Lineup ===
Pos	No.	Driver	Team	Manufacturer
1	8	Tyler Reddick	Richard Childress Racing	Chevrolet
2	17	Chris Buescher	Roush Fenway Racing	Ford
3	21	Matt DiBenedetto	Wood Brothers Racing	Ford
4	47	Ricky Stenhouse Jr.	JTG Daugherty Racing	Chevrolet
5	42	Ross Chastain	Chip Ganassi Racing	Chevrolet
6	23	Bubba Wallace	23XI Racing	Toyota
7	99	Daniel Suárez	Trackhouse Racing Team	Chevrolet
8	43	Erik Jones	Richard Petty Motorsports	Chevrolet
9	14	Chase Briscoe (R)	Stewart-Haas Racing	Ford
10	10	Aric Almirola	Stewart-Haas Racing	Ford
11	7	Corey LaJoie	Spire Motorsports	Chevrolet
12	38	Anthony Alfredo (R)	Front Row Motorsports	Ford
13	00	Quin Houff	StarCom Racing	Chevrolet
14	15	James Davison	Rick Ware Racing	Chevrolet
15	52	Josh Bilicki	Rick Ware Racing	Ford
16	33	Austin Cindric (i)	Team Penske	Ford
17	51	Cody Ware (i)	Petty Ware Racing	Chevrolet
18	78	B. J. McLeod (i)	Live Fast Motorsports	Ford
19	77	Justin Haley (i)	Spire Motorsports	Chevrolet
20	53	Garrett Smithley (i)	Rick Ware Racing	Chevrolet
21	66	Timmy Hill (i)	MBM Motorsports	Toyota
22	13	David Starr (i)	MBM Motorsports	Toyota
Official Open starting lineup

=== Race recap ===
For pre race ceremonies, Brigadier General Lisa M. Craig would give out the command to start engines. Austin Cindric (multiple inspection failures), Ross Chastain (aero duct not conforming to NASCAR regulations), and David Starr (unapproved adjustments) were forced to start at the back.

On the start of the race, Chris Buescher was found to have jumped the restart over Tyler Reddick, and thus was given a pass through penalty. Austin Cindric was also given a pass through penalty because NASCAR determined he had switched lanes before the start-finish line. 6 laps into the 20 lap Round 1, Bubba Wallace would spin in Turn 2, causing the first caution of the day. On the ensuing restart on lap 10, Stenhouse drifted up high in Turn 3, spinning out Chris Buescher, causing the second caution of the day. Once again, on the restart on lap 14, Erik Jones would spin after hitting Chase Briscoe and spinning out, causing a major stackup within the field. Daniel Suarez would hit Jones, causing major damage to both cars. After a hard fought battle, Ross Chastain would win Round 1.

In Round 2, after a relatively less chaotic race, Tyler Reddick would successfully defend against Aric Almirola to win Round 2.

In the final round, Aric Almirola would redeem himself, pulling away to win Round 3.

Matt DiBenedetto would win the fan vote.

== Qualifying (All-Star Race) ==
Kyle Larson was awarded the pole for the race as determined by a random draw.

=== All-Star Race Starting Lineup ===
Pos	No.	Driver	Team	Manufacturer
1	5	Kyle Larson	Hendrick Motorsports	Chevrolet
2	18	Kyle Busch	Joe Gibbs Racing	Toyota
3	20	Christopher Bell	Joe Gibbs Racing	Toyota
4	41	Cole Custer	Stewart-Haas Racing	Ford
5	3	Austin Dillon	Richard Childress Racing	Chevrolet
6	9	Chase Elliott	Hendrick Motorsports	Chevrolet
7	22	Joey Logano	Team Penske	Ford
8	24	William Byron	Hendrick Motorsports	Chevrolet
9	2	Brad Keselowski	Team Penske	Ford
10	19	Martin Truex Jr.	Joe Gibbs Racing	Toyota
11	34	Michael McDowell	Front Row Motorsports	Ford
12	4	Kevin Harvick	Stewart-Haas Racing	Ford
13	1	Kurt Busch	Chip Ganassi Racing	Chevrolet
14	6	Ryan Newman	Roush Fenway Racing	Ford
15	48	Alex Bowman	Hendrick Motorsports	Chevrolet
16	11	Denny Hamlin	Joe Gibbs Racing	Toyota
17	12	Ryan Blaney	Team Penske	Ford
18	42	Ross Chastain	Chip Ganassi Racing	Chevrolet
19	8	Tyler Reddick	Richard Childress Racing	Chevrolet
20	10	Aric Almirola	Stewart-Haas Racing	Ford
21	21	Matt DiBenedetto	Wood Brothers Racing	Ford
Official All-Star starting lineup

=== Race recap ===
For driver introductions, Jamie Little and Adam Alexander announced each driver in order of the starting lineup, being accompanied by the Dallas Cowboys cheerleaders and music played by local cover band, the Clayton Foghat Band.

For pre race ceremonies, Norm Miller, chairman of Interstate Batteries gave the invocation, and the Side Deal gave an acapella version of the national anthem. Joe Gibbs and Tom Landry, Jr. would give out the command. While cars were doing warm up laps, Sammy Hagar would perform “I Can't Drive 55”.

The race would start with Kyle Busch and Kyle Larson fighting for the lead, but on lap 2 Christopher Bell would lose control of his car in Turn 1, but would save the car. Nevertheless, the first caution was called.

== NASCAR All Star Open ==
=== NASCAR All Star Open results ===
Pos	Grid	No.	Driver	Team	Manufacturer	Laps
1	10	10	Aric Almirola	Stewart-Haas Racing	Ford	50
2	3	21	Matt DiBenedetto	Wood Brothers Racing	Ford	50
3	2	17	Chris Buescher	Roush Fenway Racing	Ford	50
4	9	14	Chase Briscoe (R)	Stewart-Haas Racing	Ford	50
5	16	33	Austin Cindric (i)	Team Penske	Ford	50
6	6	23	Bubba Wallace	23XI Racing	Toyota	50
7	19	77	Justin Haley (i)	Spire Motorsports	Chevrolet	50
8	12	38	Anthony Alfredo (R)	Front Row Motorsports	Ford	50
9	4	47	Ricky Stenhouse Jr.	JTG Daugherty Racing	Chevrolet	50
10	11	7	Corey LaJoie	Spire Motorsports	Chevrolet	50
11	17	51	Cody Ware (i)	Petty Ware Racing	Chevrolet	50
12	18	78	B. J. McLeod (i)	Live Fast Motorsports	Ford	50
13	15	52	Josh Bilicki	Rick Ware Racing	Ford	50
14	20	53	Garrett Smithley (i)	Rick Ware Racing	Chevrolet	50
15	13	00	Quin Houff	StarCom Racing	Chevrolet	49
16	14	15	James Davison	Rick Ware Racing	Chevrolet	49
17	21	66	Timmy Hill (i)	MBM Motorsports	Toyota	49
18	22	13	David Starr (i)	MBM Motorsports	Toyota	49
19	1	8	Tyler Reddick	Richard Childress Racing	Chevrolet	40 ^{a}
20	5	42	Ross Chastain	Chip Ganassi Racing	Chevrolet	20 ^{b}
21	8	43	Erik Jones	Richard Petty Motorsports	Chevrolet	13
22	7	99	Daniel Suarez	Trackhouse Racing Team	Chevrolet	13
^a Winner of the second segment.^b Winner of the first segment.
Official NASCAR All Star Open race results

== All-Star Race ==
=== All-Star Race results ===
Pos	Grid	No.	Driver	Team	Manufacturer	Laps
1	1	5	Kyle Larson	Hendrick Motorsports	Chevrolet	100
2	9	2	Brad Keselowski	Team Penske	Ford	100
3	6	9	Chase Elliott	Hendrick Motorsports	Chevrolet	100
4	7	22	Joey Logano	Team Penske	Ford	100
5	17	12	Ryan Blaney	Team Penske	Ford	100
6	15	48	Alex Bowman	Hendrick Motorsports	Chevrolet	100
7	8	24	William Byron	Hendrick Motorsports	Chevrolet	100
8	20	10	Aric Almirola	Stewart-Haas Racing	Ford	100
9	2	18	Kyle Busch	Joe Gibbs Racing	Toyota	100
10	13	1	Kurt Busch	Chip Ganassi Racing	Chevrolet	100
11	3	20	Christopher Bell	Joe Gibbs Racing	Toyota	100
12	11	34	Michael McDowell	Front Row Motorsports	Ford	100
13	10	19	Martin Truex Jr.	Joe Gibbs Racing	Toyota	100
14	4	41	Cole Custer	Stewart-Haas Racing	Ford	100
15	12	4	Kevin Harvick	Stewart-Haas Racing	Ford	100
16	19	8	Tyler Reddick	Richard Childress Racing	Chevrolet	100
17	21	21	Matt DiBenedetto	Wood Brothers Racing	Ford	100
18	18	42	Ross Chastain	Chip Ganassi Racing	Chevrolet	100
19	5	3	Austin Dillon	Richard Childress Racing	Chevrolet	100
20	14	6	Ryan Newman	Roush Fenway Racing	Ford	100
21	16	11	Denny Hamlin	Joe Gibbs Racing	Toyota	100
Official NASCAR All-Star Race results

== Media ==
=== Television ===
Fox Sports was the television broadcaster of the race in the United States. Lap-by-lap announcer, Mike Joy, Jeff Gordon and Clint Bowyer called the race from the broadcast booth. Jamie Little, Regan Smith and Vince Welch handled pit road for the television side. Larry McReynolds provided insight from the Fox Sports studio in Charlotte. This was also Fox Sports' last Cup race for their portion of the 2021 season as NBC Sports takes over NASCAR broadcasts for the rest of the season.

FS1
Booth announcers	Pit reporters	In-race analyst
Lap-by-lap: Mike Joy; Color-commentator: Jeff Gordon; Color-commentator: Clint Bowyer	Jamie Little; Regan Smith; Vince Welch	Larry McReynolds

=== Radio ===
Motor Racing Network (MRN) continued their longstanding relationship with Speedway Motorsports to broadcast the race on radio. The lead announcers for the race's broadcast were Alex Hayden and Jeff Striegle. The network also implemented two announcers on each side of the track: Dave Moody in turns 1 and 2 and Mike Bagley in turns 3 and 4. Steve Post and Kim Coon were the network's pit lane reporters. The network's broadcast was also simulcast on Sirius XM NASCAR Radio.

MRN Radio
Booth announcers	Turn announcers	Pit reporters
Lead announcer: Alex Hayden; Announcer: Jeff Striegle	Turns 1 & 2: Dave Moody; Turns 3 & 4: Mike Bagley	Steve Post; Kim Coon
