= Kyle Larson =

American racing driver (born 1992)

- Larson at Las Vegas Motor Speedway in 2026
- Born: Kyle Miyata Larson; July 31, 1992 (age 34); Elk Grove, California, U.S.
- Achievements: Asphalt Racing: 2021, 2025, 2026 NASCAR Cup Series Champion; 2021 NASCAR Cup Series Regular Season Champion; 2012 NASCAR K&N Pro Series East Champion; 2019, 2021, 2023 NASCAR All-Star Race Winner; 2021 Coca-Cola 600 Winner; 2022 Daytona 500 Pole Winner; 2023 Southern 500 Winner; 2024 Brickyard 400 Winner; 2015 Rolex 24 at Daytona Overall Winner; Dirt Racing: 2012, 2016, 2019, 2023 Turkey Night Grand Prix Winner; 2019, 2023 Hangtown 100 Winner; 2020, 2022, 2023 Brad Doty Classic Winner; 2020 Hoosier Hundred Winner; 2020, 2021, 2025 Chili Bowl Nationals Winner; 2021 Prairie Dirt Classic Winner; 2021 37th Kings Royal Winner; 2021 BC39 Winner; 2021, 2023, 2024, 2026 Knoxville Nationals Winner; 2022 Hillbilly 100 Winner; Records: 4 Wins at Kansas Speedway (Tied-most all time)
- Awards: 2012 NASCAR K&N Pro Series East Rookie of the Year; 2013 NASCAR Nationwide Series Rookie of the Year; 2014 NASCAR Sprint Cup Series Rookie of the Year; 2022 ESPY Awards Best Driver; Named as one of NASCAR's 75 Greatest Drivers (2023); 2024 Indianapolis 500 Rookie of the Year

NASCAR Cup Series career
- 338 races run over 14 years
- Car no., team: No. 5 (Hendrick Motorsports)
- 2026 position: 1st
- Best finish: 1st (2021, 2025, 2026)
- First race: 2013 Bank of America 500 (Charlotte)
- Last race: 2026 Season Finale 400 (Homestead)
- First win: 2016 Pure Michigan 400 (Michigan)
- Last win: 2026 YellaWood 500 (Talladega)
| Wins | Top tens | Poles |
|---|---|---|
| 35 | 225 | 22 |

NASCAR O'Reilly Auto Parts Series career
- 124 races run over 11 years
- 2026 position: 69th
- Best finish: 8th (2013)
- First race: 2013 DRIVE4COPD 300 (Daytona)
- Last race: 2026 Sports Illustrated Resorts 250 (Nashville)
- First win: 2014 Treatmyclot.com 300 (California)
- Last win: 2026 Andy's Frozen Custard 340 (Texas)
| Wins | Top tens | Poles |
|---|---|---|
| 19 | 91 | 9 |

NASCAR FedEx Freight Truck Series career
- 17 races run over 8 years
- 2025 position: 77th
- Best finish: 35th (2012)
- First race: 2012 UNOH 225 (Kentucky)
- Last race: 2025 Weather Guard Truck Race (Bristol)
- First win: 2013 North Carolina Education Lottery 200 (Rockingham)
- Last win: 2025 Baptist Health 200 (Homestead)
| Wins | Top tens | Poles |
|---|---|---|
| 4 | 13 | 2 |

ARCA Menards Series career
- 3 races run over 3 years
- Best finish: 66th (2014)
- First race: 2012 RainEater Wiper Blades 200 (Michigan)
- Last race: 2014 Pocono ARCA 200 (Pocono)
- First win: 2014 Pocono ARCA 200 (Pocono)
| Wins | Top tens | Poles |
|---|---|---|
| 1 | 2 | 1 |

ARCA Menards Series East career
- 14 races run over 1 year
- Best finish: 1st (2012)
- First race: 2012 Window Wax 125 (Bristol)
- Last race: 2012 Classic 3 Championship (Rockingham)
- First win: 2012 Slack Auto Parts 150 (Jefferson)
- Last win: 2012 G-Oil 100 (New Hampshire)
| Wins | Top tens | Poles |
|---|---|---|
| 2 | 12 | 1 |

ARCA Menards Series West career
- 1 race run over 1 year
- Best finish: 47th (2014)
- First race: 2014 Carneros 200 (Sonoma)
- First win: 2014 Carneros 200 (Sonoma)
| Wins | Top tens | Poles |
|---|---|---|
| 1 | 1 | 1 |

IndyCar Series career
- 2 races run over 2 years
- Best finish: 33rd (2025)
- First race: 2024 Indianapolis 500 (Indianapolis)
- Last race: 2025 Indianapolis 500 (Indianapolis)
| Wins | Podiums | Poles |
|---|---|---|
| 0 | 0 | 0 |
- Statistics up to date as of November 8, 2026.

Kyle Miyata Larson (born July 31, 1992) is an American professional racing driver. He competes full-time in the NASCAR Cup Series, driving the No. 5 Chevrolet Camaro ZL1 for Hendrick Motorsports.

Before and throughout his stock car racing career, Larson has been highly successful in dirt track racing, with wins in several prestigious events including the Kings Royal, Knoxville Nationals, and the Chili Bowl Nationals. He also won the 24 Hours of Daytona in 2015 with CGR. Larson is the 2013 NASCAR Nationwide Series Rookie of the Year and the 2014 NASCAR Sprint Cup Series Rookie of the Year. He won the NASCAR Cup Series Championship in 2021, 2025, and 2026. Larson was named one of NASCAR's 75 Greatest Drivers in 2023.

== Racing career ==
=== Early career ===
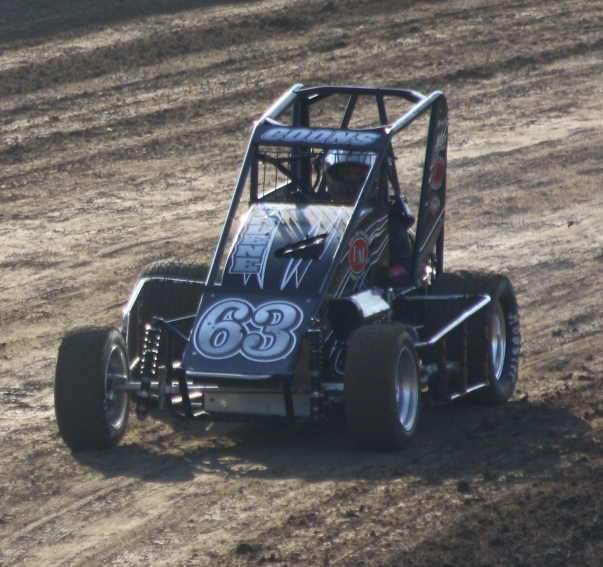
Larson racing a USAC Midget in 2012

Born on July 31, 1992, in Elk Grove, California, Larson attended his first race with his parents a week after his birth. He began racing at the age of seven in outlaw karts in Northern California. As a teenager, he raced open-wheel cars, including the United States Auto Club (USAC) midget, Silver Crown and sprint cars, competing for Keith Kunz Motorsports and Hoffman Racing with Toyota backing; During his early career in USAC, a series official gave Larson the nickname "Yung Money" in recognition of his talent. Larson also raced in the World of Outlaws sprint cars and his first sprint car race win came at Placerville Speedway where he was one of the youngest drivers to ever compete. Larson won the 2011 4-Crown Nationals at Eldora Speedway, winning in all three types of USAC cars in a single night, only the second driver in history to accomplish the feat. He won two silver crown races that season and was named the 2011 Rookie of the Year. Larson holds the sprint car track record at Ocean Speedway in 2010. In 2012, Larson won six USAC National Midget races including the Turkey Night Grand Prix. Even during his stock car career, Larson continued racing open-wheel cars for midweek races in addition to going to New Zealand in some off-seasons to race.

=== Stock cars ===
==== NASCAR K&N Pro Series and ARCA ====
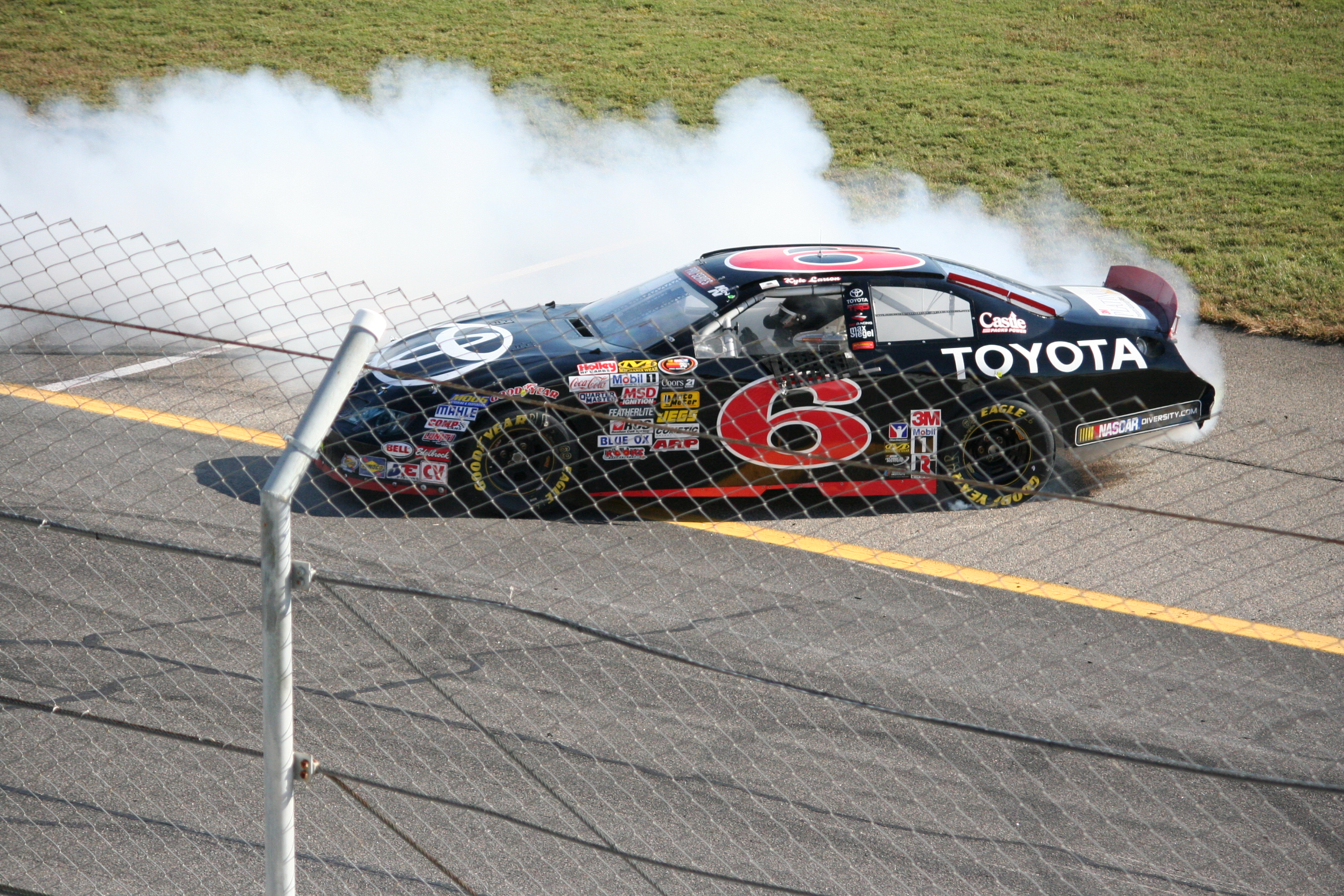
Larson's 2012 K&N Pro Series East Championship car (Drifting)

While Larson expressed some interest in IndyCar racing, he was signed for the 2012 racing season by Earnhardt Ganassi Racing (EGR) as part of the team's driver development program. On February 11, 2012, Larson won his first race in a full bodied stock car at New Smyrna Speedway. A week later, he won again at the speedway during the World Series of Asphalt.

In 2012, Larson moved full-time to the NASCAR K&N Pro Series East, driving for Rev Racing. On June 9, Larson scored his first career NASCAR K&N Pro Series East win at Gresham Motorsports Park. Nine days later, Larson made his ARCA Racing Series debut at Michigan International Speedway, where he finished 13th. Larson scored his second K&N Pro Series East win at New Hampshire Motor Speedway.

Larson won the 2012 NASCAR K&N Pro Series East championship with two wins and 12 top-tens in 14 races, overcoming the five wins of Corey LaJoie (son of two-time Busch Series champion Randy). He was also named the K&N Pro Series East Rookie of the Year. On June 7, 2014, Larson scored his first ARCA win at Pocono Raceway.

==== NASCAR Craftsman Truck Series ====
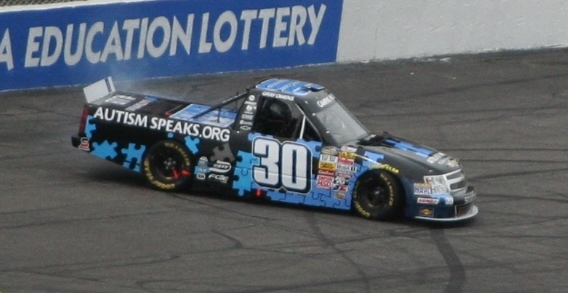
Larson's race-winning No. 30 truck at Rockingham in 2013

On June 28, 2012, Larson made his Camping World Truck Series debut at Kentucky Speedway where he finished 10th.

On April 14, 2013, Larson scored his first Truck Series win at Rockingham Speedway after he held off Joey Logano. During the celebration, Larson performed donuts without his steering wheel on, a practice he had acquired when racing go-karts. The celebration prompted NASCAR to request that he keep it attached, regarding safety concerns as Larson would not have much control of the truck without the steering wheel.

On March 29, 2016, it was announced that Larson will drive the No. 24 truck for GMS Racing at Martinsville Speedway. He finished 4th in the race. Larson scored his second career Truck Series win at Eldora Speedway.

On February 28, 2020, Larson announced he would be re-joining GMS Racing to drive the No. 24 truck at Homestead-Miami Speedway to pursue a bounty offered by Kevin Harvick to full-time Cup drivers to beat Kyle Busch. Following his suspension from NASCAR, Larson was released from the team.

On March 17, 2021, it was announced that Larson will drive the No. 44 truck for Niece Motorsports at the inaugural Bristol dirt race. Larson finished 35th after he crashed into Danny Bohn on lap 100.

In 2023, Larson scored his third career Truck Series win at North Wilkesboro.

On March 4, 2025, it was announced that Larson would compete two races for Spire Motorsports. Larson won at Homestead after he overcame a late race spin.

==== NASCAR O'Reilly Auto Parts Series ====
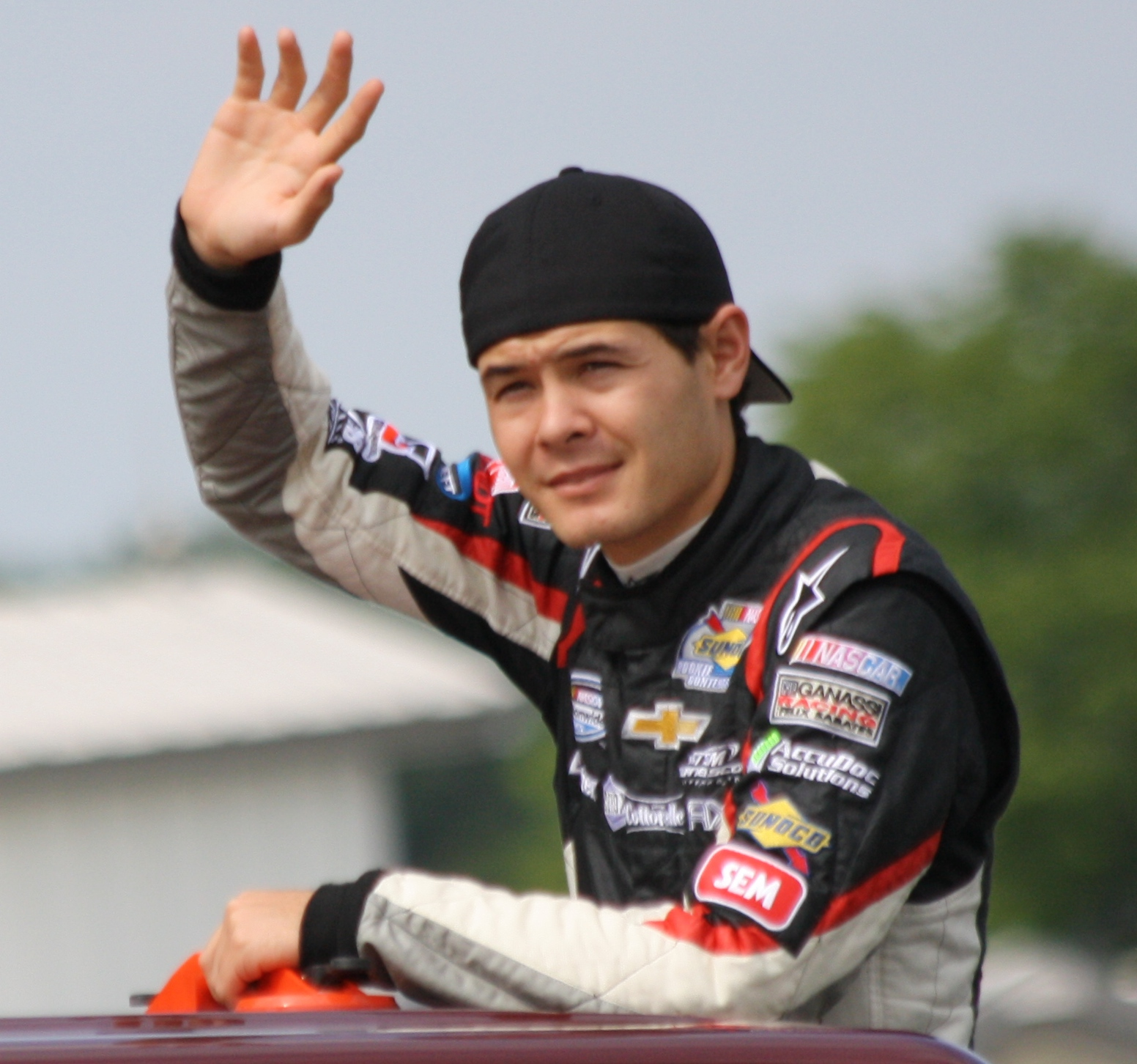
Larson during his Nationwide Series rookie season in 2013

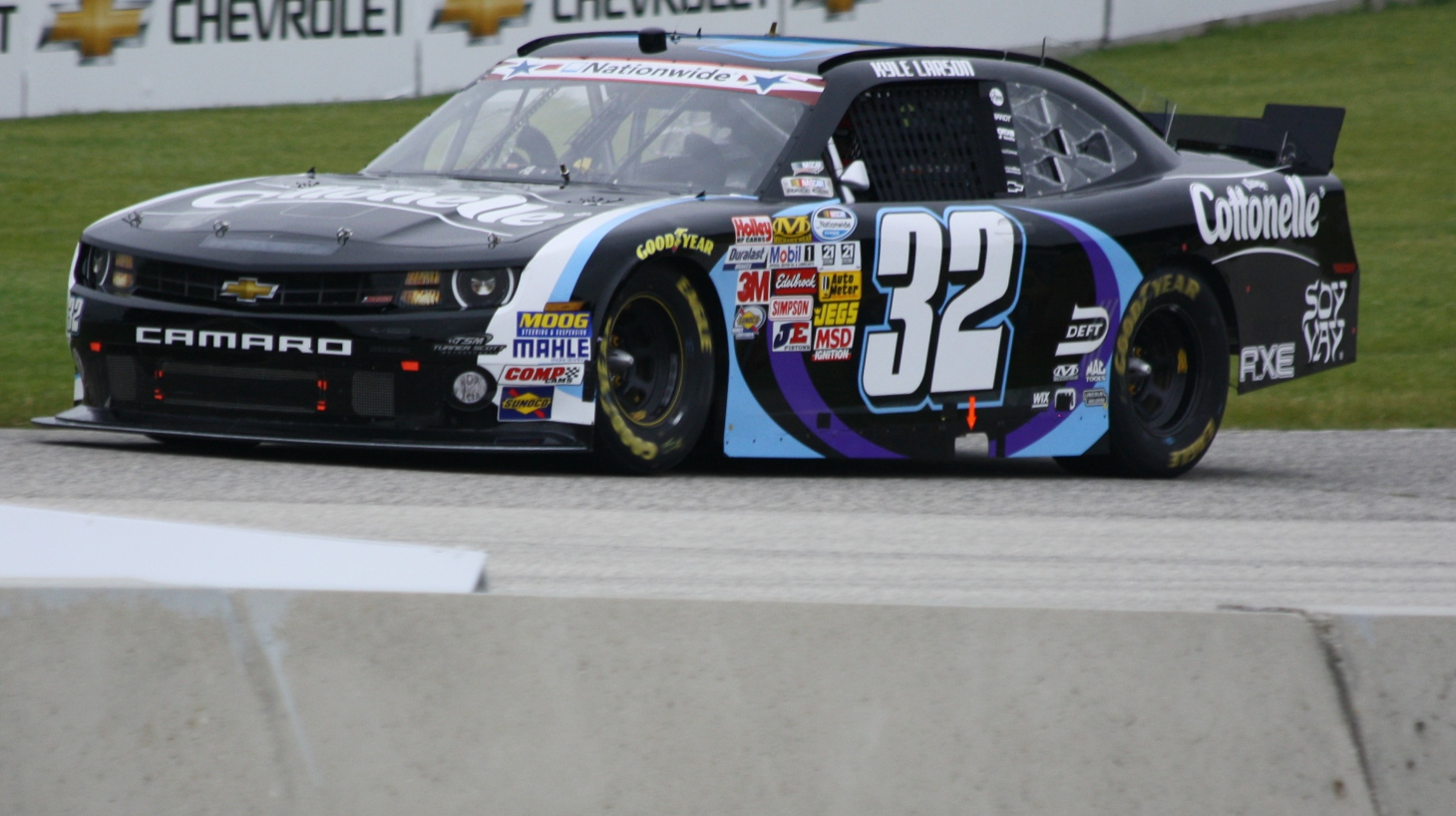
Larson's Nationwide Series car at Road America in 2013

On February 6, 2013, it was announced that Larson would compete full-time in the NASCAR Nationwide Series, driving the No. 32 car for Turner Scott Motorsports. In the season opener at Daytona, Larson was involved in a violent crash on the final lap when his car got caught onto the right side of Brad Keselowski's car and then hit the outside wall. At the same time, he was hit in the right rear by Brian Scott, which sent his car airborne and hit a crossover gate, pierced off the catch fence and completely ripped off the front end of his car. Larson came across the start/finish line in 13th. He was unharmed but the debris hurt 28 spectators in the grandstands, two of whom were in critical condition. However, there were no deaths. In the season finale at Homestead, Larson led the most laps but lost the lead to eventual winner Brad Keselowski with three laps remaining and finished second. Larson won the Nationwide Series Rookie of the Year award and became the first Asian-American and first Drive for Diversity participant to win a Rookie of the Year Award in one of NASCAR's national touring series.

Larson returned to the Nationwide Series in 2014 to drive the No. 42 car part-time for Turner Scott Motorsports. On March 22, Larson scored his first career Nationwide Series win at Auto Club Speedway. Larson once again celebrated by doing burnouts in the infield without the steering wheel. In victory lane, he stated, "Those last 11, 12 laps were the longest laps of my life. I've been so close to winning so many times, but the fashion we did it in was extra special." Larson scored his second career Nationwide Series win at Charlotte Motor Speedway.

Larson ran part-time again for HScott Motorsports in 2015. He won the season finale at Homestead and the first win for HScott Motorsports.

In 2022, Larson drove the No. 17 car for HMS at Road America where he finished second to Ty Gibbs. Larson won at Watkins Glen.

In 2023, Larson won at Darlington after a last lap pass on John Hunter Nemechek.

In 2024, Larson won at Circuit of the Americas after overtaking a dueling Shane van Gisbergen and Austin Hill on the final lap.

In 2025, Larson won at Bristol. Larson substituted for Connor Zilisch at Texas where he scored his second Xfinity Series win of the season.

==== NASCAR Cup Series ====
===== 2013: Phoenix Racing =====
On August 27, 2013, The Charlotte Observer reported that Larson will drive the No. 42 car for Chip Ganassi Racing starting in the 2014 NASCAR Sprint Cup Series season, replacing Juan Pablo Montoya. The deal was officially announced on August 30. On October 1, it was announced that Larson would make his Sprint Cup Series debut at Charlotte Motor Speedway in the No. 51 car for Phoenix Racing to prepare for his rookie season. Larson finished 37th due to a blown engine. Larson made his second Cup Series start at Martinsville Speedway where he finished 42nd after another engine failure.

===== Chip Ganassi Racing =====
====== 2014: Rookie season ======
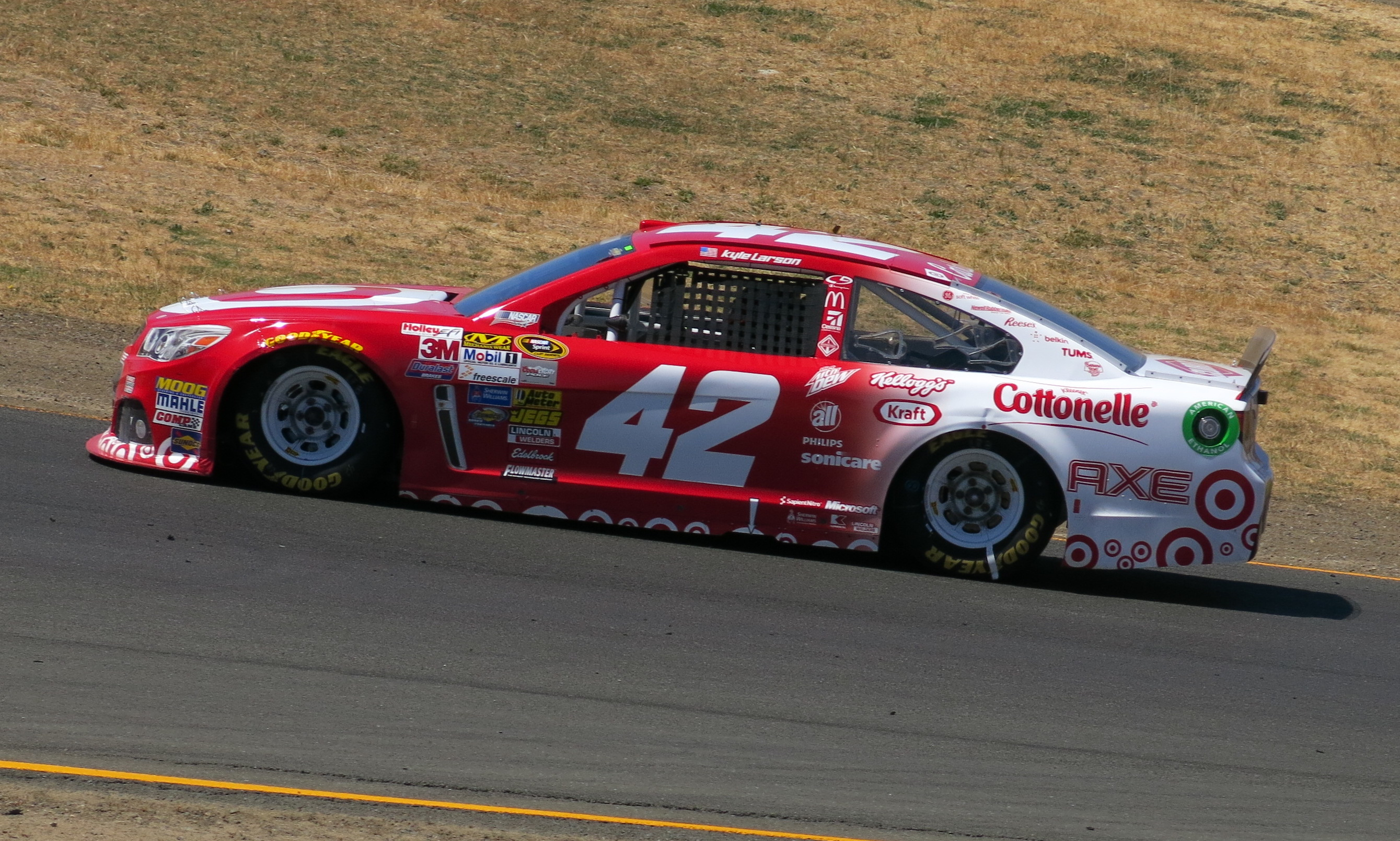
Larson's Cup Series car at Sonoma Raceway in 2014

At the 2014 Daytona 500, Larson got into the wall twice and despite the car being fixed, he spun out on lap 22. Later in the night race, Larson got wrecked by another rookie contender Austin Dillon who triggered a seven-car wreck on lap 163 and finished 38th. Larson scored his first top-ten finish at Bristol Motor Speedway. A week later, Larson earned his best career finish with a second-place finish at Auto Club Speedway. At Richmond Raceway, Larson recorded a speed of 126.880 miles per hour (204.194 km/h). After qualifying was rained out, he earned the pole based on being the fastest in practice. Larson got spun out by Clint Bowyer on the first lap and finished 16th.

At Michigan, Larson spun out on lap 7 and later in the race, he made a block on one of his strong supporters Tony Stewart while trying to go for the lead and the block damaged Stewart's grille. In response, Stewart tried to retaliate during a yellow-flag period. When told that Stewart was mad at him for the block, Larson shrugged it off replying "Tony being Tony, I guess. I was pretty tight on whoever was inside of me on the restart and I was looking in my mirror and saw him juke to the right so I juked to the right and he hit me and I don't know, he was just trying to teach me a lesson, I'm guessing." Before the Sonoma race, Stewart warned Larson, angrily saying "He'll learn not to block me anytime soon."

Larson won his first Cup Series pole for the Gobowling.com 400 where he set the track record with a lap speed of 183.438 mph (295.215 km/h). He finished 11th in the race. Larson earned the Sprint Cup Series Rookie of the Year award with eight top-fives and 17 top-tens. His rookie statistics were better than those of several notable drivers, including Richard Petty and Jeff Gordon.

====== 2015 ======
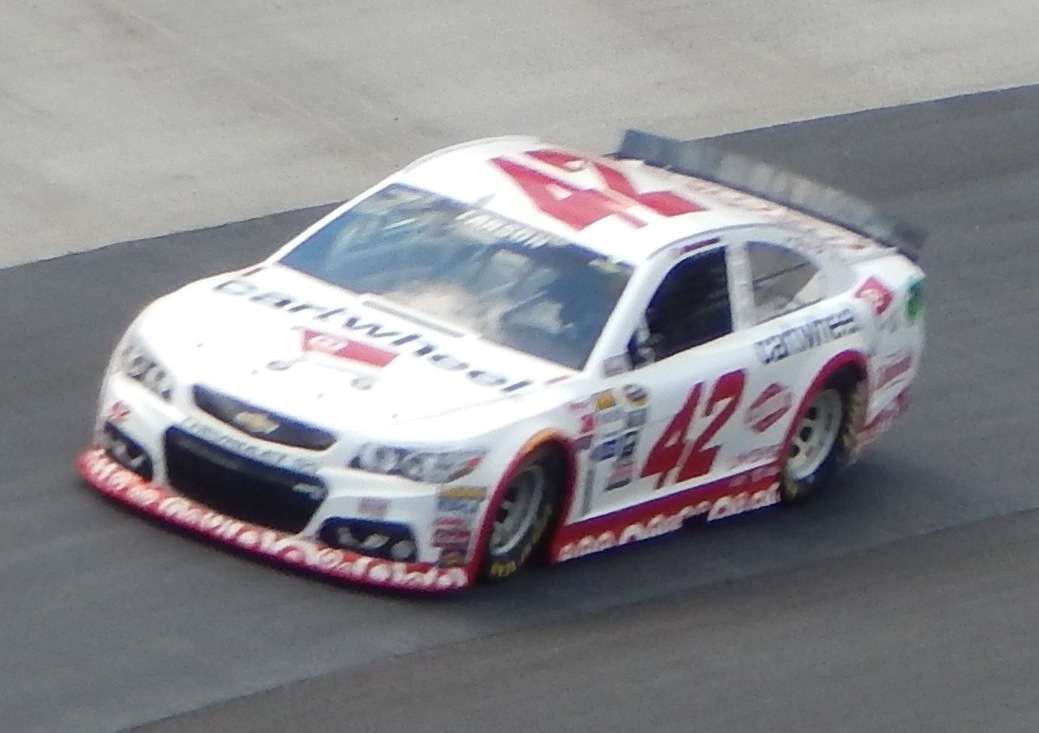
Larson's No. 42 car at Bristol Motor Speedway in 2015

Larson began the season with a 34th-place finish at the 2015 Daytona 500. During an autograph session at Martinsville, Larson fainted and was hospitalized. He was replaced by Regan Smith. Two days later, Larson was released from the hospital with a diagnosis of dehydration as being the cause of the faint. At Charlotte, Larson and Kyle Busch collided each other coming to pit road while under caution that took both drivers out of contention for the win. After a disappointing season, Larson finished 19th in the points standings.

====== 2016 ======
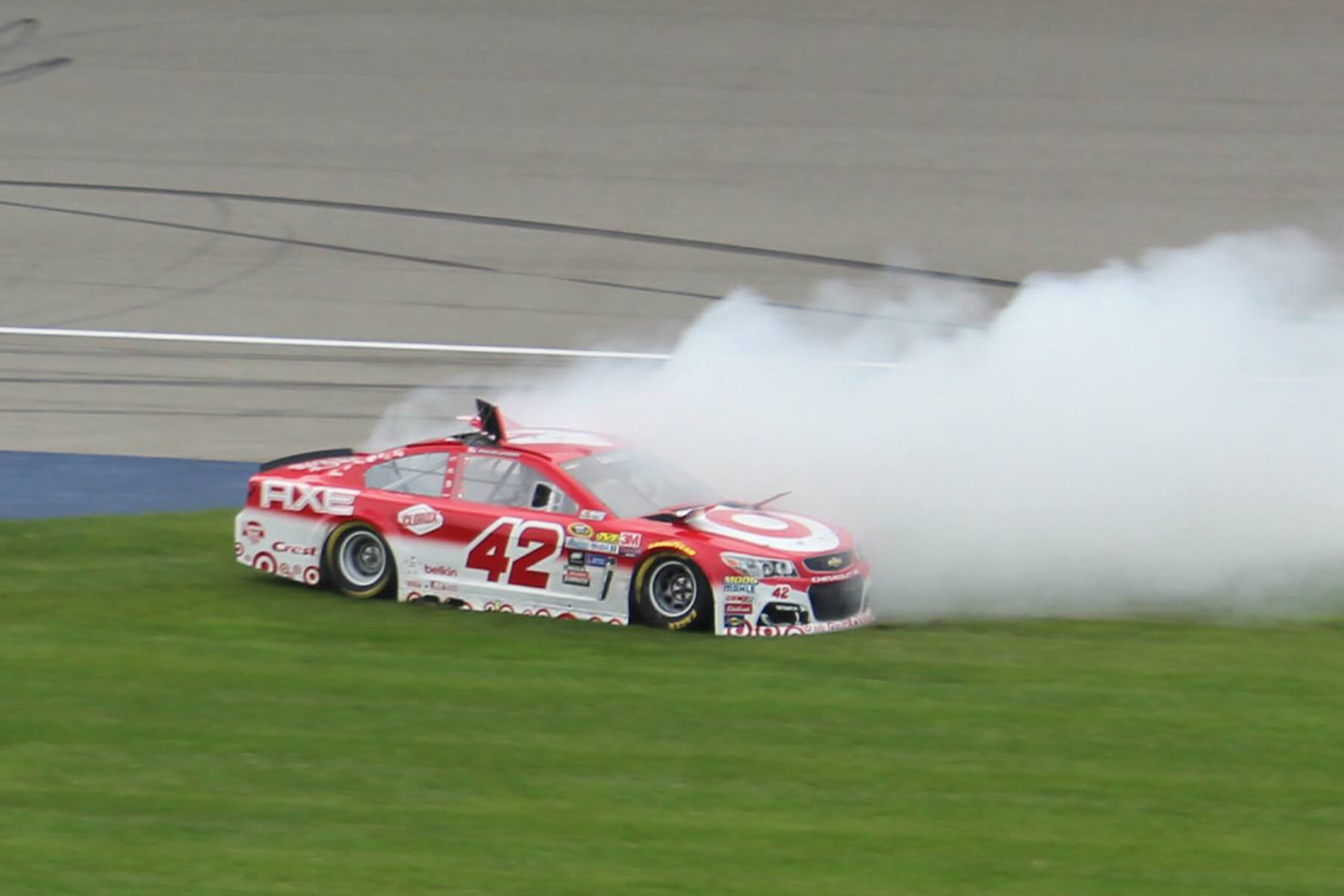
Larson celebrating after scoring his first career Cup Series win at Michigan

Larson began the season with a seventh-place finish at the 2016 Daytona 500, his first top-ten and first non-DNF. At Auto Club Speedway, Larson blew a left rear tire that sent him into a slide and suffered a head on collision with the inside wall on lap 48 but he was not injured. On May 21, Larson won the Sprint Showdown after he edged out rookie Chase Elliott to earn a spot into the All-Star Race. At the Sprint All-Star race, Larson took the lead on the final restart and almost won until he got passed by Joey Logano and Larson hit the turn 1 wall with two laps to go and finished 16th.

On August 28, Larson scored his first ever Sprint Cup Series win at Michigan and earned him a spot into the Chase. In his first chase appearance, Larson finished 18th at Chicagoland and finished tenth at New Hampshire. At Dover, Larson suffered an early power issue and was penalized for having too many men over the wall. On lap 183, Larson blew a right front tire and hit the wall. He finished 25th and was eliminated from the Chase.

====== 2017 ======
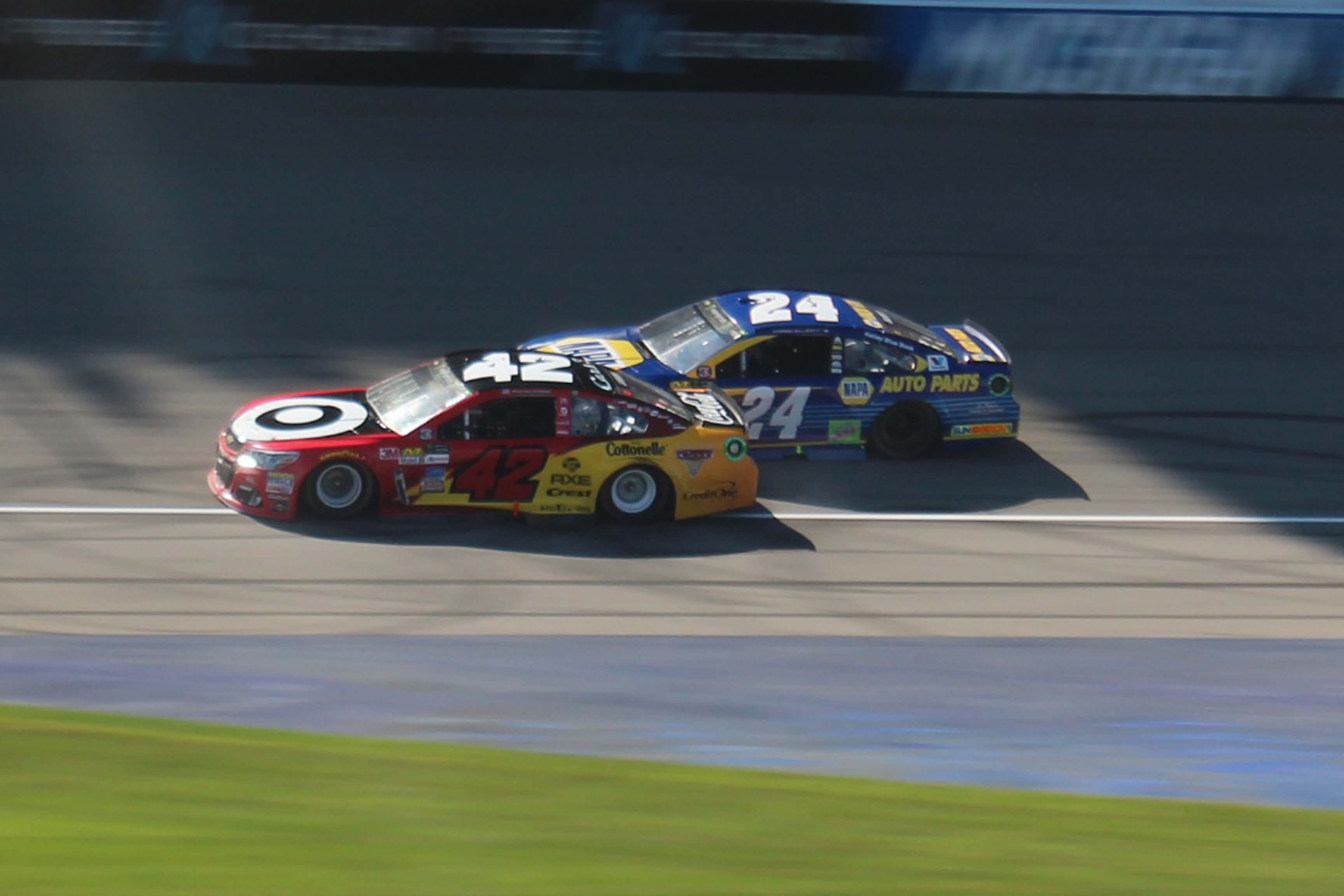
Larson and Chase Elliott battle for the lead during the 2017 FireKeepers Casino 400

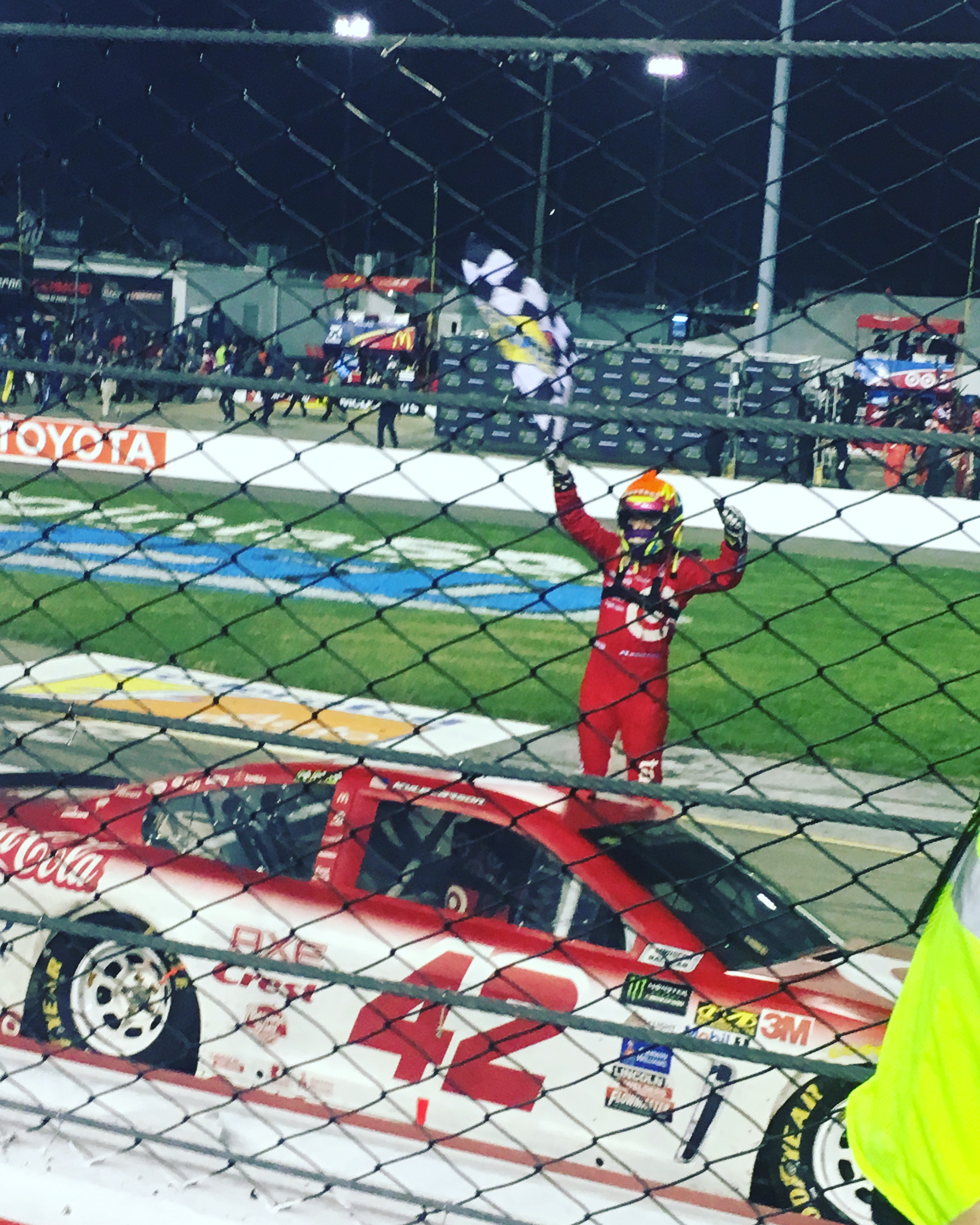
Larson waving the checkered flag in the air after winning the 2017 Federated Auto Parts 400

At the 2017 Daytona 500, Larson was leading late only to run out of fuel on the final lap and finished 12th. After three consecutive second-place finishes at Atlanta, Las Vegas and Phoenix, Larson moved up to first in the points standings. On March 26, Larson scored his second career Cup Series win at Auto Club Speedway from the pole. Larson scored his second win of the season at Michigan.

At Kentucky, Larson started at the rear of the field after he was unable to set a qualifying time as he was stuck in an inspection and finished second. Four days later, Larson lost his points lead in the standings when he was penalized 35 points for an improper rear brake cooling assembly. Crew chief Chad Johnston was suspended for three races and Tony Lunders took his place. A week later, Larson won the pole for the Loudon's Overton's 301 but was forced to surrender it to Martin Truex Jr. after failing post-qualifying inspection for an unapproved rear deck fin lid. He finished second in the race after starting 39th.

At the Pure Michigan 400, Larson took the lead on the final restart after he made a four-wide pass and went on to score his third straight Michigan win. Larson won the regular season finale at Richmond (and his first win that is not a two-mile track).

Larson made it to the Round of 12 after he scored top-five finishes at Chicagoland, New Hampshire, and Dover. Larson's championship hopes ended at Kansas where he finished 39th after an engine blew up on lap 78. Larson's bad luck continued as he finished 37th at Texas and Martinsville, both due to crashes, and a last-place finish at Phoenix from an expired engine, his fourth straight DNF. Larson ended the season eighth in the points standings.

====== 2018 ======
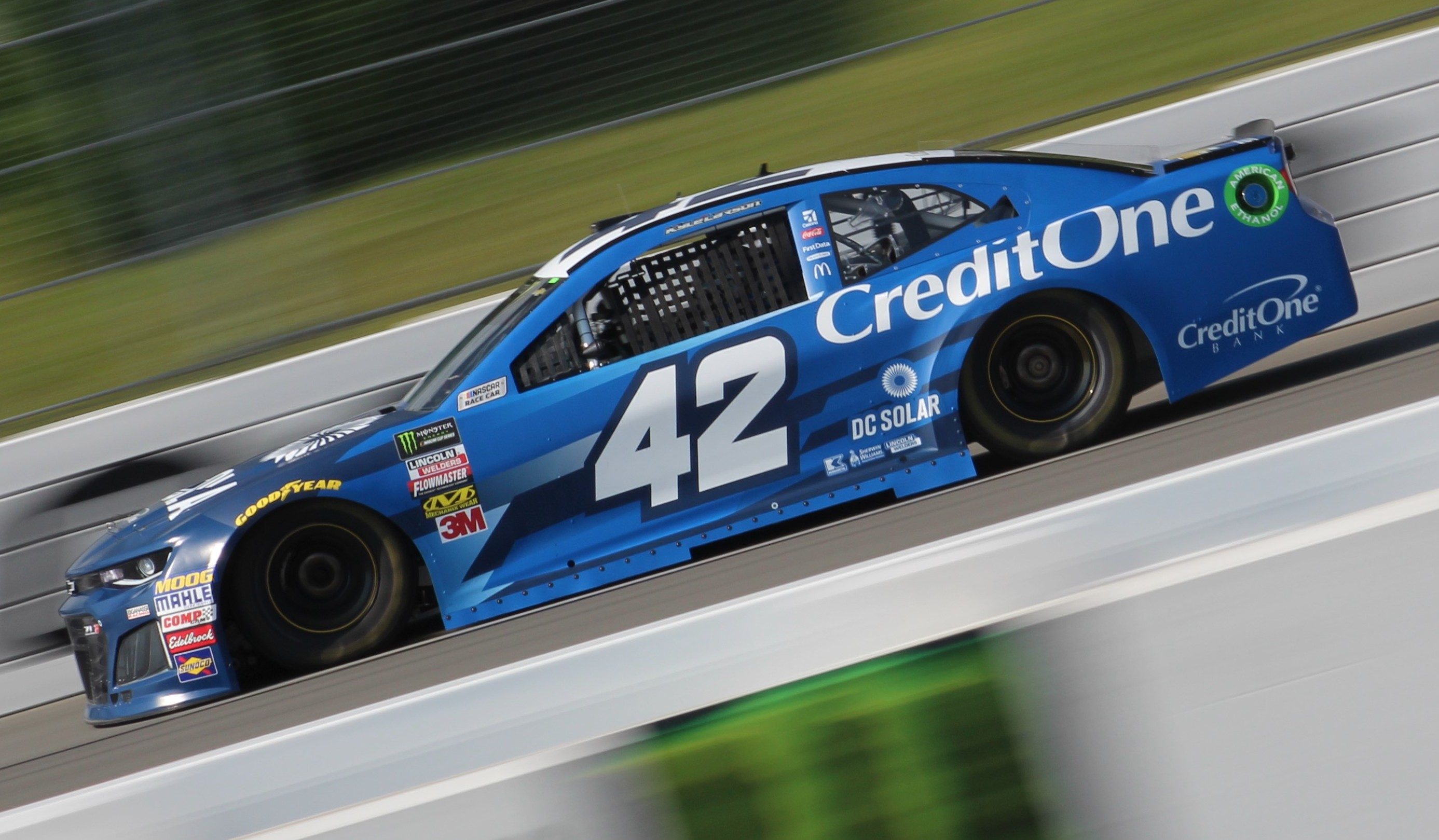
Larson racing at Pocono Raceway in 2018

Despite not scoring a win throughout the 2018 season, Larson made it to the playoffs by staying consistent with five second-place finishes, eight top-fives, and 13 top-tens. At the Charlotte Roval, Larson led 47 laps and was in contention for the win until he was involved in a multi-car wreck on a late restart that also included playoff contenders Brad Keselowski and Kyle Busch. Despite being involved in the wreck, Larson barely advanced into the Round of 12 after he passed Jeffrey Earnhardt who was stalled on the track after Earnhardt got spun out by Daniel Hemric.

Larson experienced further bad luck at the Talladega fall race when he blew a right front tire and spun out on lap 105. He finished 11th but the No. 42 team was docked 10 driver and 10 owner points after the team violated the damaged vehicle policy by using metal tabs instead of fasteners and/or tape to repair the torn right front fender. Larson was eliminated from the Round of 12 after he finished third at the Kansas fall race. Larson ended the season ninth in the points standings, the highest of the winless drivers in 2018 along with a third consecutive top-ten points finish.

====== 2019 ======
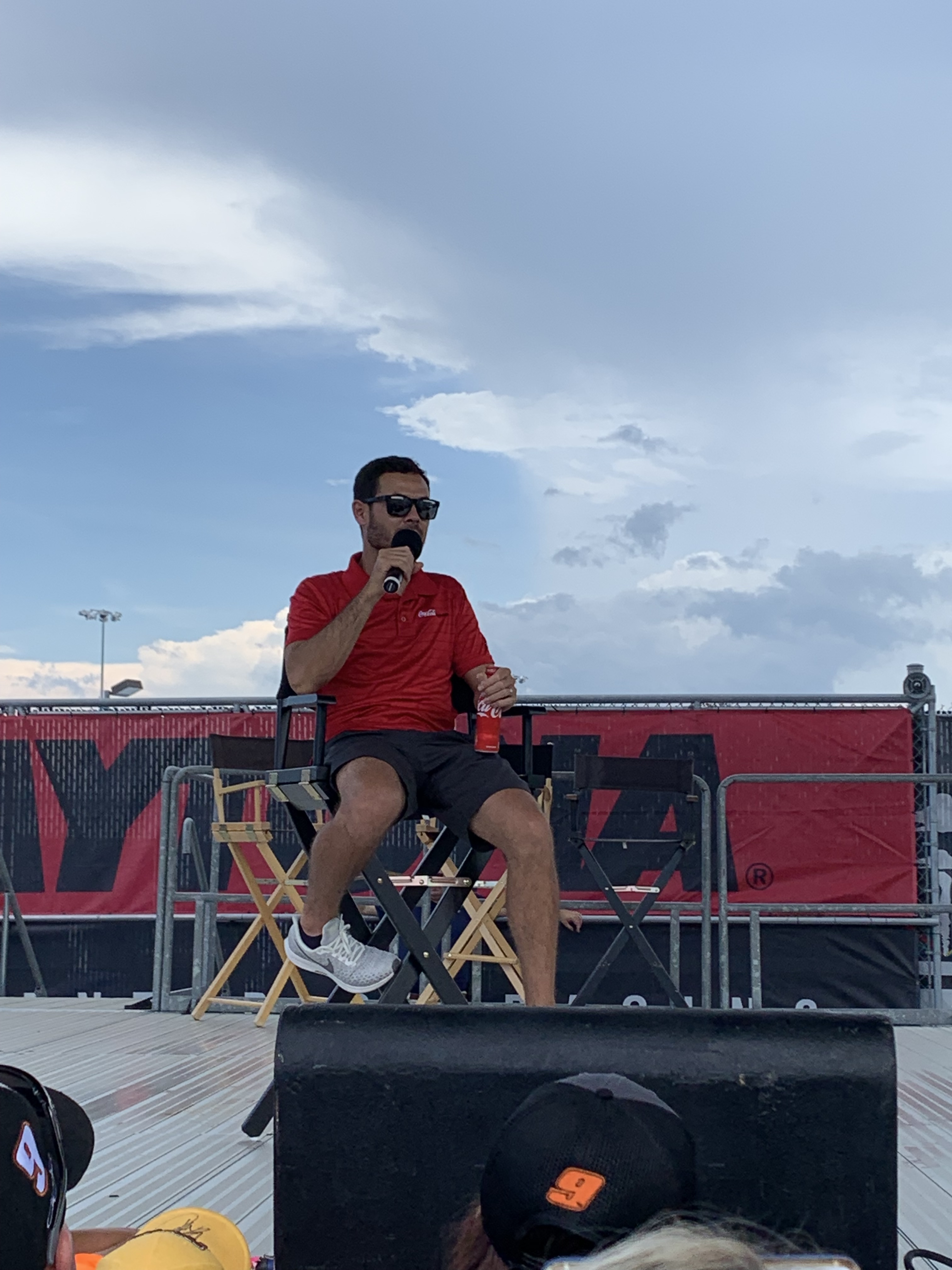
Larson during the Fanzone at Daytona International Speedway on July 5, 2019

Before the start of the 2019 season, Larson lost his primary sponsor DC Solar, whose headquarters had been raided by the FBI on December 18, 2018. Larson began the season with a seventh-place finish at the 2019 Daytona 500. A week later at Atlanta, Larson led over 100 laps before he was penalized for speeding on pit road which sent him to the back of the field and finished 12th. On February 26, Larson sparked controversy on the NBC Sports segment Splash & Go! with host Rick Allen when he jokingly implied that Hendrick Motorsports starts "cheating and finding some speed" a couple of months into the start of a season. Larson later apologized to Rick Hendrick for his comments.

At the Talladega spring race, Larson was involved in a major accident on the final lap when his car went airborne and rolled over multiple times. He was uninjured. On May 18, Larson won the Monster Energy NASCAR All-Star Race. After a second-place finish at Darlington, Larson clinched his spot in the playoffs for the fourth straight year despite no wins.

Larson scored his first win of the season at Dover, snapped a 75-race winless streak to advance into the Round of 8. At the Talladega fall race, Larson was involved in a multi-car wreck on lap 108 that left him with a fractured lower rib. Despite a fourth-place finish at Phoenix, Larson failed to advance to the Championship 4. Larson ended the season sixth in the points standings, his career-best to date.

====== 2020 and suspension ======
Larson began the season with a 10th-place finish at the 2020 Daytona 500. At Auto Club Speedway, Larson got turned into the turn 1 wall by Denny Hamlin, relegated him to a 21st-place finish. When the season was placed on hold after four races due to the COVID-19 pandemic, Larson was seventh in the points standings with one top-five and two top-tens.

On April 13, Larson was indefinitely suspended by Chip Ganassi Racing without pay after he used a racial slur during an iRacing event the day before. Shortly after Ganassi's announcement, NASCAR also suspended Larson indefinitely and ordered him to complete sensitivity training before he was allowed to race again. Larson was also suspended by the World of Outlaws but his suspension was lifted prior to their return to racing. Multiple corporations such as McDonald's, Credit One Bank, and Chevrolet also terminated their sponsorship of Larson. The next day, Larson was fired from the team. On April 27, Matt Kenseth took over the No. 42 car for the rest of the 2020 season.

On October 4, after months of inactivity on social media, Larson posted an essay on his website, apologizing for using the slur and denying that it was representative of who he was. In the statement, Larson said that when racing overseas, he encountered people who used the word regularly. Larson accepted accountability for his actions, including his suspension and dismissal from CGR, and said that although he finished the sensitivity training, he did more than what was required of him to change his behavior; for instance, he went to Minnesota after George Floyd was murdered and participated in a variety of classes to learn more on the African-American community.

The statement also said that some of the people in his career, including Ganassi, kept in touch with him during his rehabilitation which convinced him to have hope in saving his career. Larson also said that he hopes his setback "was a lesson for everyone" and was in the process of seeking reinstatement to the Cup Series. In mid-October, it was reported that Larson officially applied for reinstatement. On the same month, it was announced that NASCAR had reinstated Larson's competition privileges effective on January 1, 2021.

===== Hendrick Motorsports =====
====== 2021: First championship ======
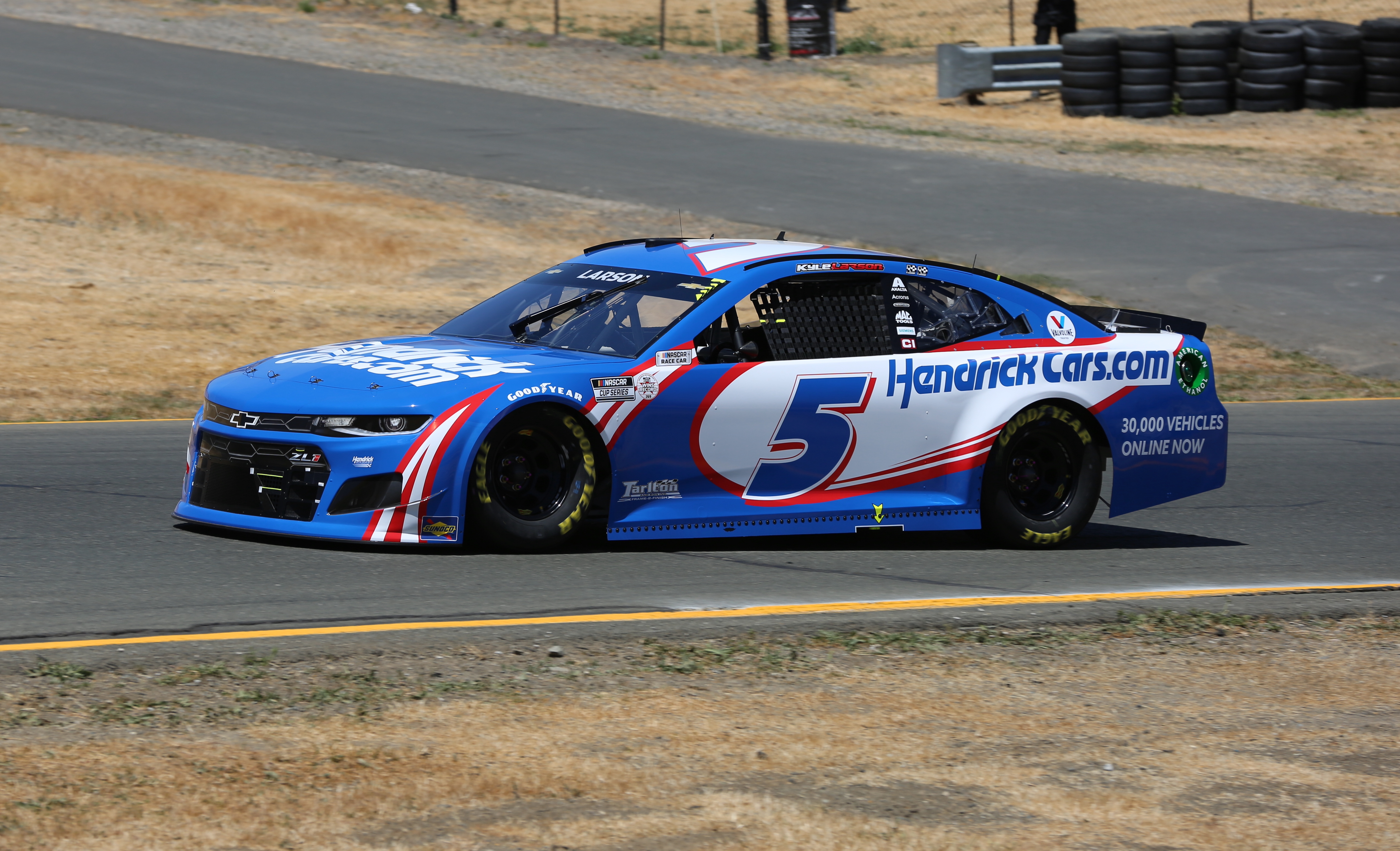
Larson's race-winning car at Sonoma Raceway in 2021

On October 28, 2020, it was announced that Hendrick Motorsports signed Larson to a multi-year deal to drive the No. 5 car beginning in the 2021 NASCAR Cup Series season. At the time of the announcement, it was also announced that the No. 5 car was not sponsored yet, though Hendrick announced that he would self-sponsor the car through his HendrickCars.com and NationsGuard companies until they found long-term sponsors. It was also announced later on that, although Hendrick normally did not allow their drivers to race anywhere other than their NASCAR team, the team negotiated a clause in the contract allowing Larson to continue racing dirt races, provided that he focused primarily on the Cup program.

Larson began the season with a 10th-place finish at the 2021 Daytona 500. On March 7, Larson scored his first win with HMS at Las Vegas. He had finished second nine times on 1.5-mile tracks prior to his victory.

On May 30, Larson won the Coca-Cola 600. Larson's victory was also the 269th career Cup victory for Hendrick Motorsports, surpassing Petty Enterprises for the most Cup victories as a race team in NASCAR history. A week later, Larson scored his first road course win at Sonoma. The following week, Larson won the NASCAR All-Star Race, becoming the ninth driver to win the All-Star Race more than once. He also became the eighth driver in NASCAR Cup Series history to win the Coca-Cola 600 and the All-Star race in the same season. Larson scored his third consecutive win at Nashville (All-Star races, as they are not points-paying, are not included).

At the first Pocono doubleheader race, Larson took the lead from his teammate Alex Bowman with four laps to go and was on the verge of a fourth consecutive win until he blew a left front tire into the third turn on the final lap and Bowman went on to win the race while Larson finished ninth. The next day, despite resorting to a backup car as a result of the incident, Larson rebounded to finish second to Kyle Busch after a fuel gamble.

Larson scored his fifth win of the season at Watkins Glen, a career-high. After the Watkins Glen race, Larson and Denny Hamlin were tied for the points lead in the regular season standings. Following the Coke Zero Sugar 400, Larson clinched the regular season championship.

At Darlington, Larson led 156 laps but finished second to Hamlin. During the Federated Auto Parts 400, Larson earned enough points to lock himself into the Round of 12. Larson scored his sixth win of the season at the Bristol night race. His win would somewhat be overshadowed by an altercation between Kevin Harvick and Chase Elliott after the race due to an on-track incident.

Larson scored his seventh win of the season at the Charlotte Roval after overcoming an electrical issue. He became the first driver in NASCAR Cup Series history to win three different road courses in the same season and also became the first driver since Kasey Kahne in 2006 to sweep both Charlotte races.

In the third round of the playoffs, Larson won at Texas to secure a spot into the Championship 4. A week later, Larson scored his ninth win of the season at Kansas and became the first driver since Dale Earnhardt in 1987 to win three straight races twice in the same season.

In the Championship 4 at Phoenix, Larson started on the pole and led 107 laps en route to his tenth win of the season and clinched his first NASCAR Cup Series championship. He became the first driver to have 10 wins and a championship in the same season since Jimmie Johnson did it in 2007 season. Larson ended his 2021 championship season with 10 wins, 18 stage wins, 20 top-fives, 26 top-tens, 2,581 laps led, and an average finish of 9.1.

====== 2022 ======
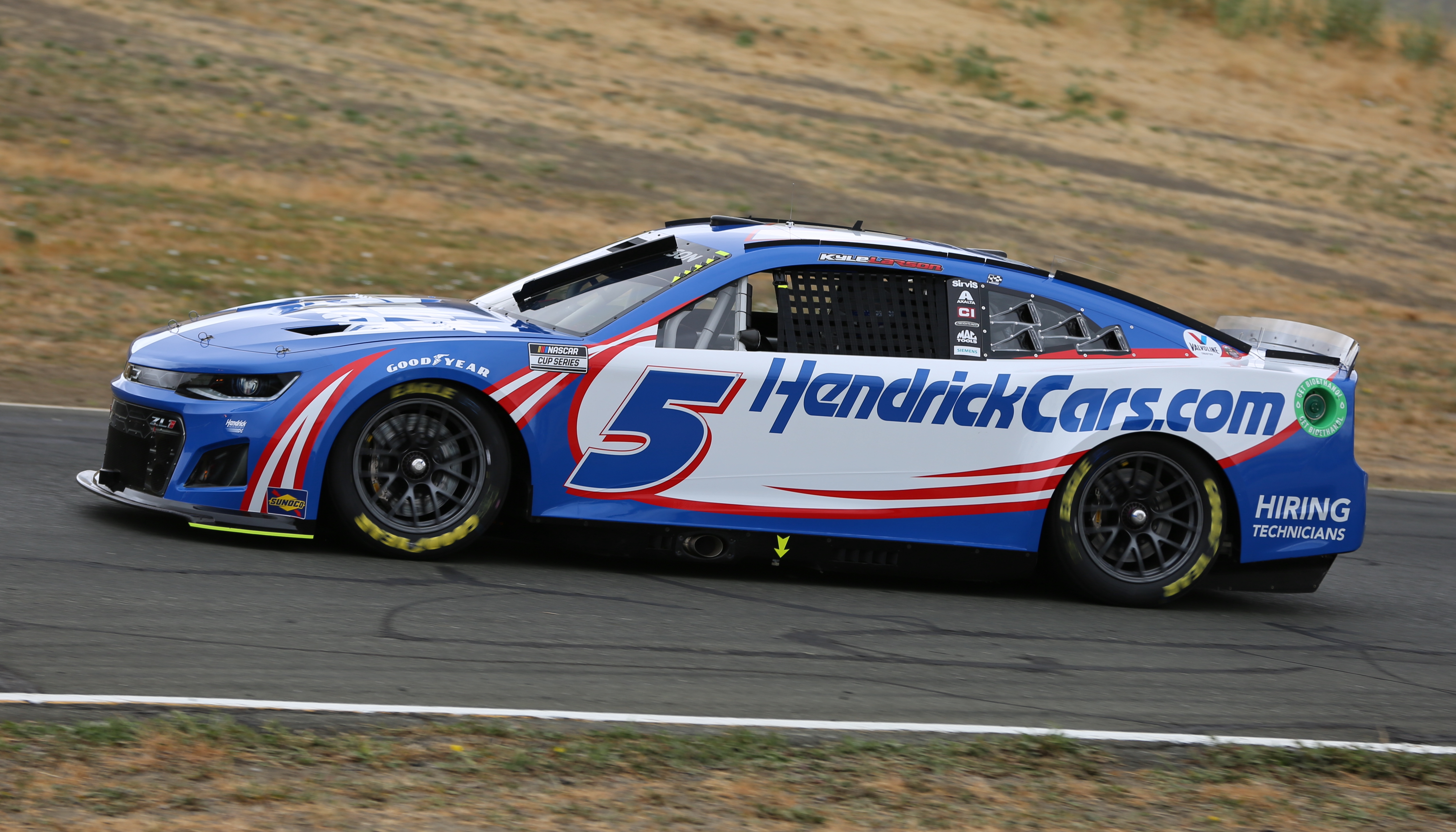
Larson's No. 5 car at Sonoma Raceway in 2022

Larson started on the pole at the 2022 Daytona 500 and finished 32nd after he was involved in a crash on lap 192. The following week, Larson scored his first win of the season at Auto Club Speedway. At Sonoma, Larson's No. 5 car lost a wheel on lap 84. Two days later, crew chief Cliff Daniels was suspended for four races as a result. Kevin Meendering, who served as a crew chief for Jimmie Johnson during the 2019 season, filled in for Daniels. Larson scored his second win of the season at Watkins Glen. One week later at Daytona, Larson started on the pole after qualifying was cancelled due to rain and his day ended early when an engine expired on lap 15 and he finished 37th.

At Darlington, Larson suffered another engine issue earlier in the race and spun out on lap 193 but he recovered later and finished 12th. On September 16, HMS announced that Larson had signed a multi-year contract extension to remain with the team through 2026. Larson was eliminated from the Round of 12 after the Charlotte Roval race.

At Las Vegas, Larson was right rear hooked down the frontstretch by Bubba Wallace on lap 94 and Christopher Bell was also caught in the wreck. During the caution, Wallace engaged in a shoving match with Larson. The incident led to Wallace's one race suspension. A week later, Larson scored his third win of the season at Homestead. Larson ended the season seventh in the points standings.

====== 2023 ======
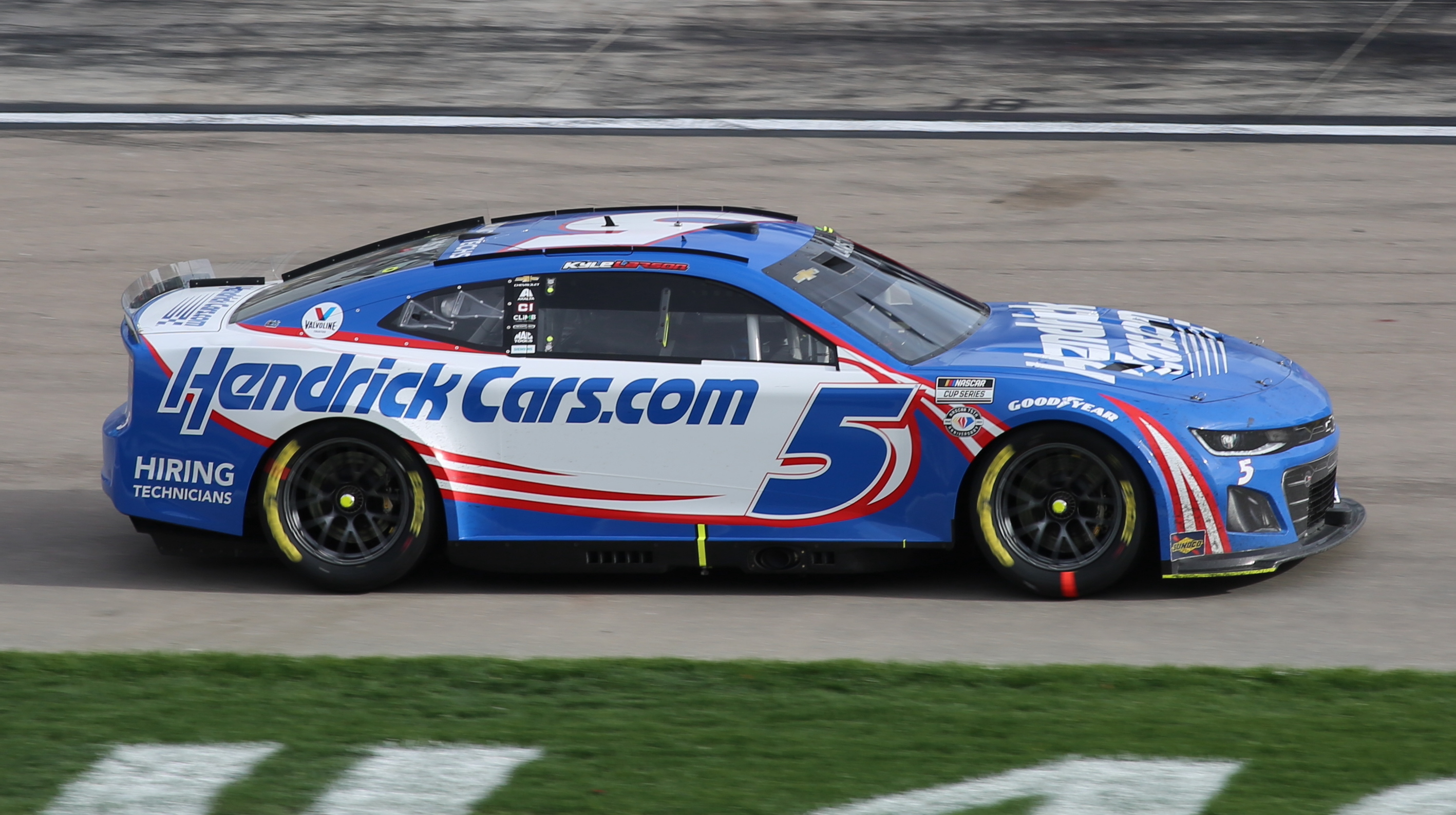
Larson's No. 5 car at Las Vegas Motor Speedway in 2023

Larson began the season with a 18th-place finish at the 2023 Daytona 500. On March 15, the No. 5 was served an L2 penalty after unapproved hood louvers was found installed on the car during pre-race inspection at Phoenix. As a result, the team was docked 100 driver and owner points and 10 playoff points. In addition, crew chief Cliff Daniels was suspended for four races and fined US$100,000. On March 29, the National Motorsports Appeals Panel amended the penalty, upholding the fine and Daniels' suspension but the No. 5 team has restored the owner, driver, and playoff points.

Larson scored his 20th career Cup Series win at Richmond. Two weeks later, he won at Martinsville and it was also the first win for the No. 5 car at that track since 1984. At the NASCAR All-Star Race, Larson scored his third career All-Star race win that tied him with Dale Earnhardt and Jeff Gordon as a three-time All-Star winner and the only driver to win the All-Star race on three different race tracks (Charlotte, Texas & North Wilkesboro).

On September 3, Larson won the Southern 500 to clinch a spot into the Round of 12. It is also the 500th overall win by Hendrick Motorsports' engine department. Larson won at Las Vegas to make the Championship 4. At Homestead, Larson crashed into the pit road entrance sand barrels on lap 214. In the season finale at Phoenix, Larson finished third behind Ryan Blaney who ultimately won the 2023 NASCAR Cup Series championship and ended the season second in the points standings.

====== 2024 ======
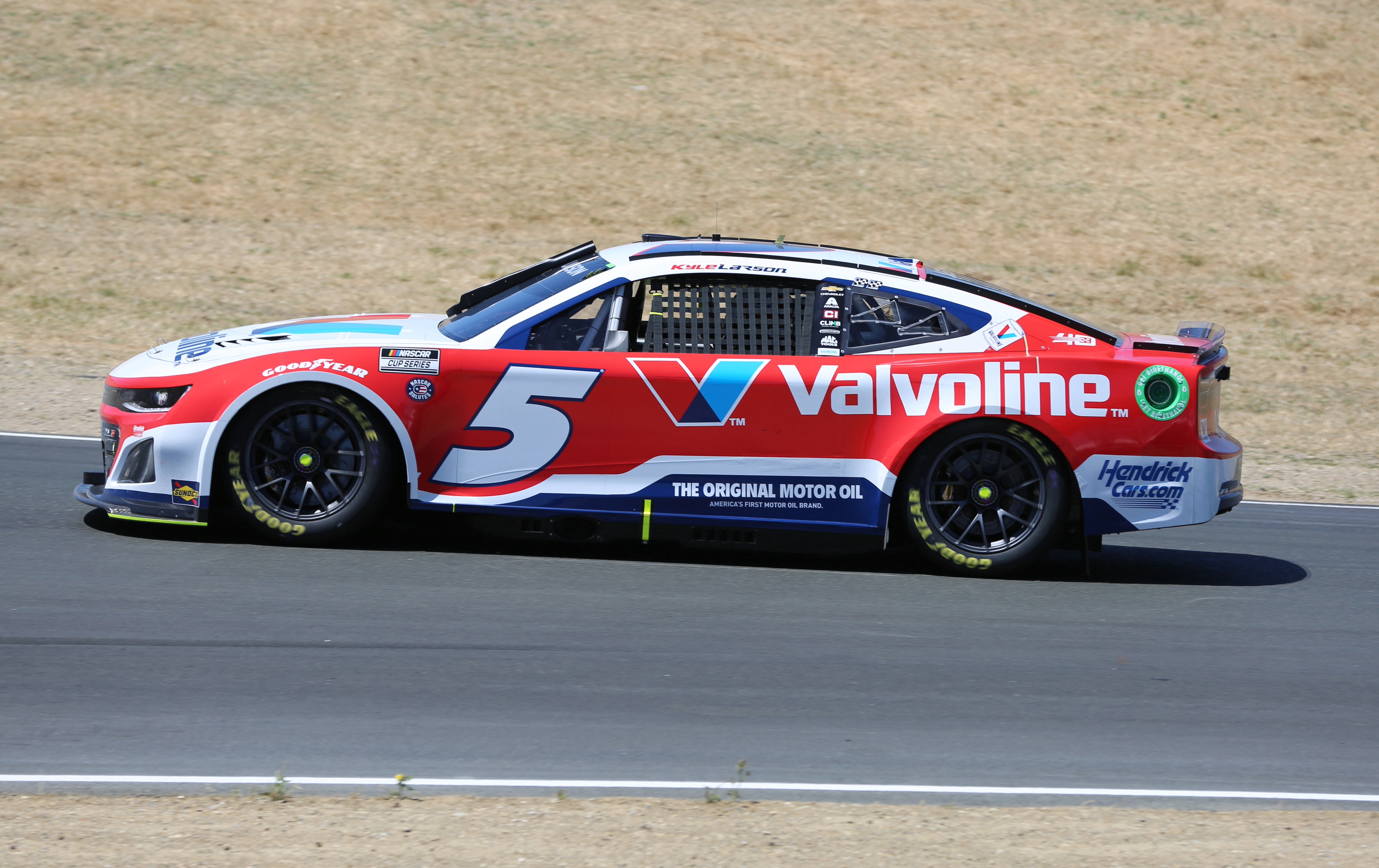
Larson's race-winning car at Sonoma Raceway in 2024

Larson began the season with a 11th-place finish at the 2024 Daytona 500. Larson scored his first win of the season at Las Vegas. At the Kansas spring race, Larson won by 0.001 seconds over Chris Buescher, the closest finish in NASCAR Cup Series history. Larson attempted to run both the Indianapolis 500 and the Coca-Cola 600 on the same day, but the rain delayed the Indy 500 caused him to miss the start of the Coke 600 and was substituted by Justin Allgaier who finished 13th. Despite missing the Coke 600 race, Larson was granted a waiver to maintain his playoff eligibility.

Larson scored his third win of the season at Sonoma. His 26th career win tied him with Dale Earnhardt Jr. and Fred Lorenzen on the all-time wins record list in the Cup Series. The victory also made Larson the tenth driver in NASCAR Cup history to win five road course races. On July 21, Larson won the Brickyard 400. During the playoffs, Larson scored wins at the Bristol night race and at the Charlotte Roval. Larson finished third at Martinsville but he did not advance to the Championship 4. Larson ended the season sixth in the points standings.

====== 2025: Second championship ======
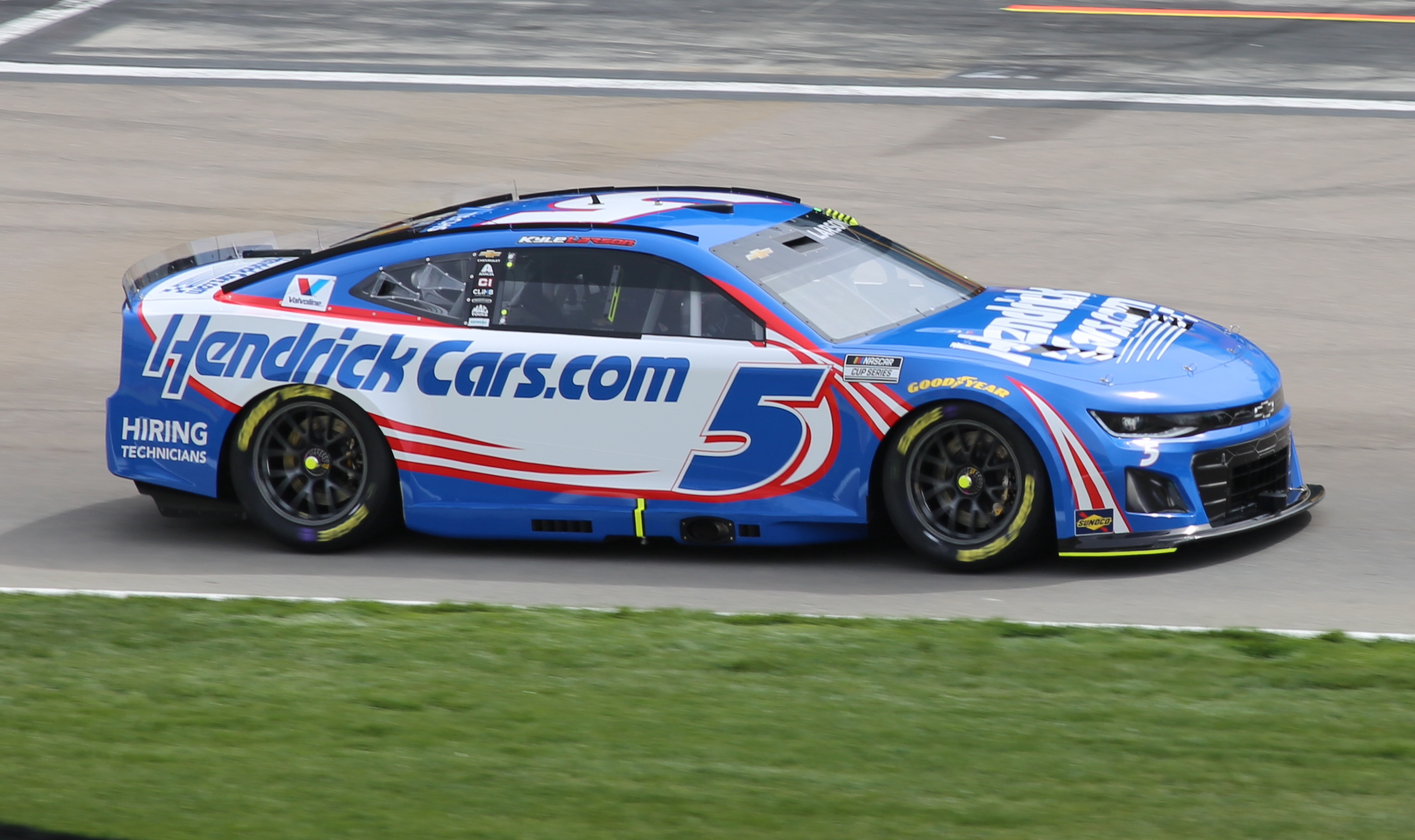
Larson's No. 5 car at Las Vegas Motor Speedway in 2025

Larson began the season with a 20th-place finish at the 2025 Daytona 500. Larson scored his 30th career win at Homestead and the win placed him 30th on the all-time wins list in the Cup Series. Three weeks later, Larson scored his second win of the season at the Bristol spring race. He scored his third win of the season at the Kansas spring race. Despite not winning a race during the playoffs, Larson made the Championship 4 after he finished fifth at Martinsville. In the season finale at Phoenix, Larson suffered a right front tire issue and went a lap down but got the wave around when a caution came out on lap 221. On the final restart, Larson restarted fifth and finished third to win his second Cup Series championship.

====== 2026: Third championship ======
On February 11, Larson signed a five-year contract extension to remain with HMS through 2031. Larson began the season with a 16th-place finish at the 2026 Daytona 500. After making the chase without a win, Larson won at Gateway, broke a 51-race winless streak. Two weeks later, Larson scored his second win of the season at Kansas. Larson won his first drafting track at Talladega. In the season finale at Homestead, Larson clinched his third Cup Series championship and he became the first driver to win back-to-back championships since Jimmie Johnson in 2010.

=== Open-wheel career ===
==== Dirt car racing ====
Larson owned a World of Outlaws sprint car team named Kyle Larson Racing that fielded a car for Carson Macedo. He acquired full ownership of the team, formerly named Larson Marks Racing, after the 2017 season. The team closed following the 2020 season due to COVID-19 pandemic and other issues. He drives for his own team (midgets) and Paul Silva (winged sprint car) on a limited schedule.

On January 18, 2020, Larson scored his first Chili Bowl nationals win over three-time Chili Bowl winner Christopher Bell. On May 5, It was announced that Larson would compete in the World of Outlaws at Knoxville Raceway beginning in the spring after a suspension and subsequent reinstatement to the series. He finished tenth in the race. At Federated Auto Parts Raceway, Larson set a qualifying lap time of 9.995 seconds, the first sub-ten-second time in track history. After finishing second to brother-in-law Brad Sweet in the Friday feature, Larson held off Brent Marks and Sweet in the Saturday event to score his first World of Outlaws victory since suspension.

In June, Larson joined the USAC series for the 2020 Indiana Midget Week. He won all six races in the Hoosier state, including the championship. Larson continued to win nine straight sprint car features. On June 25, Larson competed in the full Pennsylvania Speedweek for 410 sprint cars. Larson won at Grandview Speedway after passing Freddie Rahmer with two laps remaining. Larson scored his second win that same week after he led the entire race at Hagerstown.

Larson won the Mitch Smith Memorial at Williams Grove Speedway. The following night, he won again in the final event at Port Royal Speedway. Larson won the Pennsylvania Speedweek title with four wins and three podiums. Larson competed in the All Star Circuit of Champions sprint cars at Knoxville Raceway where he scored his seventh consecutive win. Following the 2020 season, Larson was named the 410 Sprint Car Driver of the Year.

Following a test at Cherokee Speedway in August 2020, Larson announced he would be making his debut in a dirt late model at Port Royal Speedway in the Lucas Oil Late Model Dirt Series for owner Kevin Rumley. After a fifth-place finish in the first night of the event, Larson led flag-to-flag in the second night's race to win in his second dirt late model start.

Larson won the USAC Silver Crown Series finale at Springfield Mile. On October 27, it was announced that Larson would make his World of Outlaws Late Model Series debut at Charlotte. Larson competed the final two races of the season on The Dirt Track at Charlotte Motor Speedway where he set a new track record in qualifying and finished eighth.

Following his reinstatement by NASCAR and signing with Hendrick Motorsports in October 2020, Larson noted in an interview with The Dale Jr. Download that he would be permitted to continue dirt racing, in addition to the Cup Series, provided the latter be his primary commitment.

On January 16, 2021, Larson scored his second consecutive Chili Bowl Nationals win. A week later, he won the first Lucas Oil Late Model Dirt Series race of the season at All-Tech Raceway. Larson won the third annual BC39 race against 74 USAC National Midgets on the dirt track at Indianapolis Motor Speedway. On August 14, Larson scored his first Knoxville Nationals win.

Larson won back-to-back Knoxville Nationals in 2023 and 2024, and became the eighth multi-time winner of the event.

On January 18, 2025, Larson won his third Chili Bowl Nationals after starting from the pole and led the 40 lap race flag-to-flag. On August 16, 2026, Larson scored his fourth Knoxville Nationals win.

==== IndyCar ====
On January 12, 2023, it was announced that Larson would attempt to qualify for the 2024 Indianapolis 500 with Arrow McLaren and Hendrick Motorsports and would try to become the fifth driver to attempt the double. After a rain-delayed start of the Indy 500, Larson started fifth and ran among the leading cars before he was penalized for speeding on pit lane and finished 18th. The rain delay impacted Larson's tight schedule, caused him to miss the start of the Coca-Cola 600. Larson was named the 2024 Indianapolis 500 Rookie of the Year.

On September 10, 2024, it was announced that Larson would return to the 2025 Indianapolis 500 with McLaren agreeing to pick up the second-year option. At Indianapolis, Larson lost control and crashed in turn two on lap 91 which also collected Kyffin Simpson and Sting Ray Robb. Larson finished 27th but was later credited with a 24th-place finish after Marcus Ericsson, Kyle Kirkwood, and Callum Ilott's cars failed post-race inspection due to technical infractions.

=== Other racing ===
On January 4, 2014, Chip Ganassi Racing announced that Larson would enter the 24 Hours of Daytona in the No. 02 car alongside Scott Dixon, Tony Kanaan and Marino Franchitti. During the press conference, Larson stated, "You grow up watching the NASCAR guys then you're like, 'wow' when you meet them. And then watching the guys in different series there's a 'wow' factor to meeting them and working with them." In his Rolex 24 debut, Larson's car stalled and received a speeding penalty but finished his stint with a fifth-place finish.

Larson returned in the No. 02 Ford Daytona Prototype for the 2015 event along with Chip Ganassi Racing teammates from IndyCar Scott Dixon and Tony Kanaan, and NASCAR Jamie McMurray. The team ultimately won the race.

In 2016, Larson once again returned for the 24 Hours of Daytona in the Ford EcoBoost Daytona Prototype for Chip Ganassi Racing. The team consisted of the same drivers from the 2015 winning car but ran into issues with brake failures plaguing the team throughout the race.

== In popular media ==
Larson made a cameo appearance as a limo driver in the 2017 film Logan Lucky.

On June 19, 2026, he was announced as the cover athlete for the NASCAR 26 video game by iRacing Studios at the Coronado Street Course weekend.

== Personal life ==
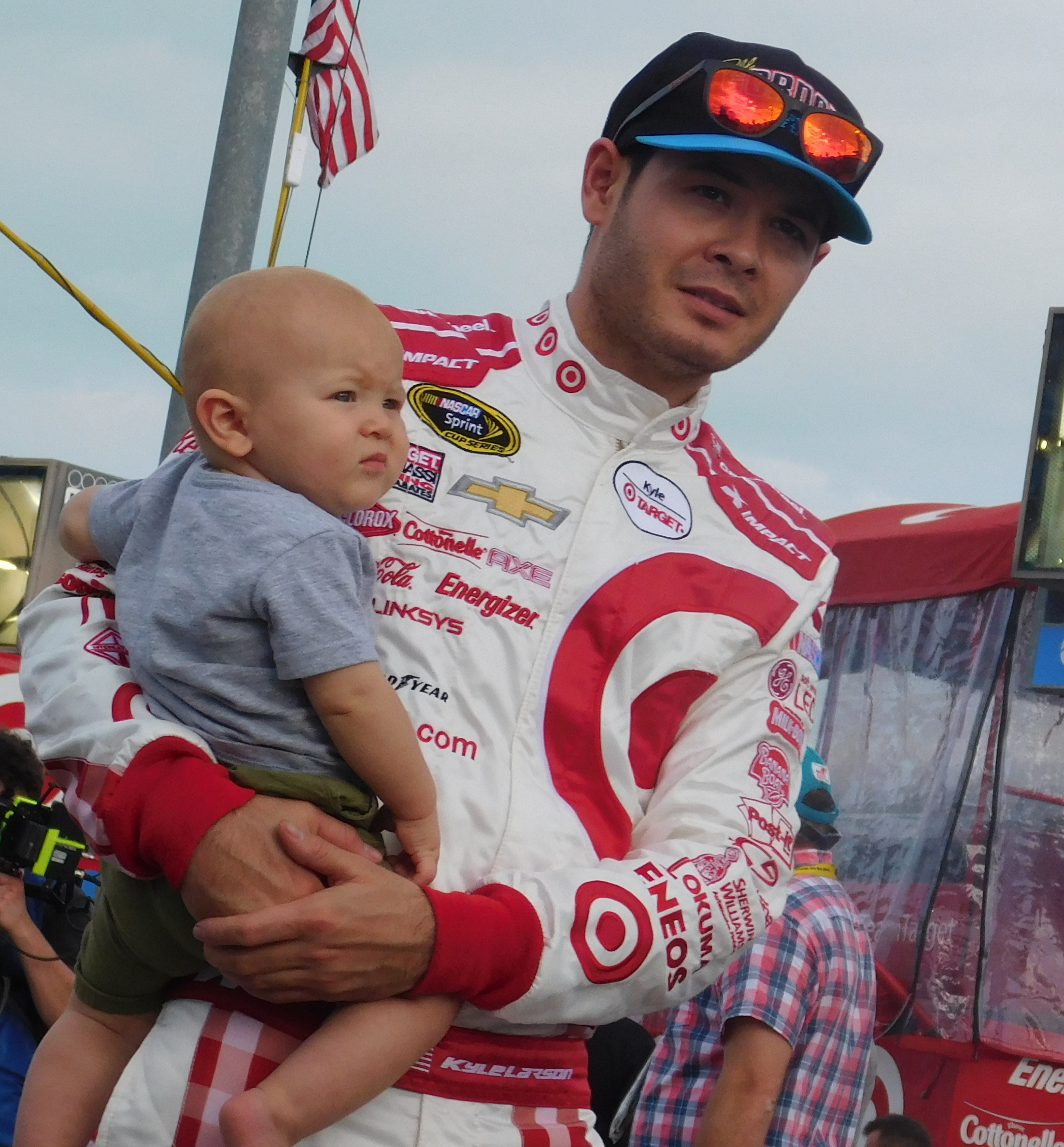
Larson and his son Owen in 2015

Larson is a native of Elk Grove, California. His mother is Japanese American and her parents spent time in a Japanese internment camp. Larson's wife is Katelyn Sweet, the sister of former World of Outlaws Sprint Car Series driver and NASCAR driver Brad Sweet. Larson announced on June 13, 2014, that he and his girlfriend were expecting their first child. On July 16, Larson announced that the baby was a boy. Owen Miyata Larson was born on December 22, 2014. On November 8, 2017, Larson announced on social media that he and Katelyn were expecting a second child, due in May 2018. Audrey Layne Larson was born in 2018. On December 22, 2017, Larson and Sweet became engaged, and they were married on September 26, 2018. On December 31, 2022, Larson and Katelyn's third child Cooper Donald Larson was born.

== Racing record ==
=== Career summary ===
| Year | Series | Team | Races | Wins | Top 5 | Top 10 | Poles | Points | Position |
|---|---|---|---|---|---|---|---|---|---|
| 2012 | NASCAR K&N Pro Series East | Rev Racing | 14 | 2 | 8 | 12 | 1 | 536 | **1st** |
| 2012 | NASCAR Camping World Truck Series | Turner Motorsports | 4 | 0 | 2 | 3 | 0 | 134 | 35th |
| 2012 | ARCA Racing Series | Eddie Sharp Racing | 1 | 0 | 0 | 0 | 0 | 165 | 102nd |
| 2013 | NASCAR Nationwide Series | Turner Scott Motorsports | 33 | 0 | 9 | 17 | 0 | 995 | 8th |
| 2013 | NASCAR Camping World Truck Series | Turner Scott Motorsports | 4 | 1 | 1 | 2 | 0 | 0^{1} | 85th |
| 2013 | ARCA Racing Series | Turner Scott Motorsports | 1 | 0 | 1 | 1 | 0 | 220 | 95th |
| 2013 | NASCAR Sprint Cup Series | Phoenix Racing | 4 | 0 | 0 | 0 | 0 | 0^{1} | 57th |
| 2014 | NASCAR Sprint Cup Series | Chip Ganassi Racing | 36 | 0 | 8 | 17 | 1 | 1080 | 17th |
| 2014 | IMSA Tudor United SportsCar Championship | Chip Ganassi Racing | 1 | 0 | 0 | 0 | 0 | 24 | 46th |
| 2014 | NASCAR Nationwide Series | Turner Scott Motorsports | 28 | 2 | 14 | 21 | 1 | 0^{1} | 80th |
| 2014 | NASCAR Camping World Truck Series | Turner Scott Motorsports | 3 | 0 | 1 | 1 | 2 | 0^{1} | 92nd |
| 2014 | NASCAR K&N Pro Series West | Turner Scott Motorsports | 1 | 1 | 1 | 1 | 1 | 48 | 47th |
| 2014 | ARCA Racing Series | Turner Scott Motorsports | 1 | 1 | 1 | 1 | 1 | 250 | 66th |
| 2015 | NASCAR Sprint Cup Series | Chip Ganassi Racing | 35 | 0 | 2 | 10 | 0 | 872 | 19th |
| 2015 | IMSA Tudor United SportsCar Championship | Chip Ganassi Racing | 1 | 1 | 1 | 1 | 0 | 36 | 23rd |
| 2015 | NASCAR Xfinity Series | HScott Motorsports | 14 | 1 | 4 | 9 | 0 | 0^{1} | 87th |
| 2015 | NASCAR Camping World Truck Series | JR Motorsports | 1 | 0 | 0 | 1 | 0 | 0^{1} | 93rd |
| 2016 | NASCAR Sprint Cup Series | Chip Ganassi Racing | 36 | 1 | 10 | 15 | 0 | 2288 | 9th |
| 2016 | NASCAR Xfinity Series | Chip Ganassi Racing | 16 | 2 | 11 | 14 | 0 | 0^{1} | 87th |
| 2016 | IMSA WeatherTech SportsCar Championship | Chip Ganassi Racing | 1 | 0 | 0 | 0 | 0 | 25 | 29th |
| 2016 | NASCAR Camping World Truck Series | GMS Racing | 3 | 1 | 3 | 3 | 0 | 0^{1} | 82nd |
| 2017 | Monster Energy NASCAR Cup Series | Chip Ganassi Racing | 36 | 4 | 15 | 20 | 3 | 2320 | 8th |
| 2017 | NASCAR Xfinity Series | Chip Ganassi Racing | 11 | 3 | 9 | 10 | 2 | 0^{1} | 86th |
| 2018 | Monster Energy NASCAR Cup Series | Chip Ganassi Racing | 36 | 0 | 12 | 19 | 3 | 2299 | 9th |
| 2018 | NASCAR Xfinity Series | Chip Ganassi Racing | 6 | 4 | 4 | 4 | 1 | 0^{1} | 83rd |
| 2019 | Monster Energy NASCAR Cup Series | Chip Ganassi Racing | 36 | 1 | 8 | 17 | 1 | 2339 | 6th |
| 2020 | NASCAR Cup Series | Chip Ganassi Racing | 4 | 0 | 1 | 3 | 0 | 121 | 34th |
| 2021 | NASCAR Cup Series | Hendrick Motorsports | 36 | 10 | 20 | 26 | 2 | 5040 | **1st** |
| 2021 | NASCAR Camping World Truck Series | Niece Motorsports | 1 | 0 | 0 | 0 | 0 | 0^{1} | 115th |
| 2022 | NASCAR Cup Series | Hendrick Motorsports | 36 | 3 | 13 | 19 | 4 | 2354 | 7th |
| 2022 | NASCAR Xfinity Series | Hendrick Motorsports | 2 | 0 | 2 | 2 | 1 | 0^{1} | 74th |
| 2022 | NASCAR Xfinity Series | JR Motorsports | 1 | 1 | 1 | 1 | 0 | 0^{1} | 74th |
| 2023 | NASCAR Cup Series | Hendrick Motorsports | 36 | 4 | 15 | 18 | 2 | 5034 | **2nd** |
| 2023 | NASCAR Xfinity Series | Kaulig Racing | 1 | 1 | 1 | 1 | 0 | 0^{1} | 75th |
| 2023 | NASCAR Xfinity Series | Hendrick Motorsports | 2 | 1 | 1 | 1 | 1 | 0^{1} | 75th |
| 2023 | NASCAR Craftsman Truck Series | Spire Motorsports | 1 | 1 | 1 | 1 | 0 | 0^{1} | 86th |
| 2024 | IndyCar Series | McLaren-Hendrick | 1 | 0 | 0 | 0 | 0 | 21 | 36th |
| 2024 | NASCAR Cup Series | Hendrick Motorsports | 35 | 6 | 15 | 18 | 5 | 2378 | 6th |
| 2024 | NASCAR Xfinity Series | Hendrick Motorsports | 2 | 1 | 2 | 2 | 1 | 0^{1} | 79th |
| 2025 | IndyCar Series | McLaren-Hendrick | 1 | 0 | 0 | 0 | 0 | 6 | 33rd |
| 2025 | NASCAR Cup Series | Hendrick Motorsports | 36 | 3 | 15 | 22 | 1 | 5034 | **1st** |
| 2025 | NASCAR Xfinity Series | Hendrick Motorsports | 3 | 1 | 3 | 3 | 1 | 0^{1} | 76th |
| 2025 | NASCAR Xfinity Series | JR Motorsports | 1 | 1 | 1 | 1 | 0 | 0^{1} | 76th |
| 2025 | NASCAR Craftsman Truck Series | Spire Motorsports | 2 | 1 | 2 | 2 | 0 | 0^{1} | 77th |
| 2026 | NASCAR Cup Series | Hendrick Motorsports | 36 | 3 | 15 | 21 | 0 | 2501 | **1st** |
| 2026 | NASCAR O'Reilly Auto Parts Series | JR Motorsports | 5 | 2 | 4 | 5 | 1 | 0^{1} | 69th |

=== NASCAR ===
(key) (Bold – Pole position awarded by qualifying time. Italics – Pole position earned by points standings or practice time. * – Most laps led. ** – All laps led.)

==== Cup Series ====
NASCAR Cup Series results
| Year | Team | No. | Make | 1 | 2 | 3 | 4 | 5 | 6 | 7 | 8 | 9 | 10 | 11 | 12 | 13 | 14 | 15 | 16 | 17 | 18 | 19 | 20 | 21 | 22 | 23 | 24 | 25 | 26 | 27 | 28 | 29 | 30 | 31 | 32 | 33 | 34 | 35 | 36 | NCSC | Pts | Ref |
|---|---|---|---|---|---|---|---|---|---|---|---|---|---|---|---|---|---|---|---|---|---|---|---|---|---|---|---|---|---|---|---|---|---|---|---|---|---|---|---|---|---|---|
| 2013 | Phoenix Racing | 51 | Chevy | DAY | PHO | LVS | BRI | CAL | MAR | TEX | KAN | RCH | TAL | DAR | CLT | DOV | POC | MCH | SON | KEN | DAY | NHA | IND | POC | GLN | MCH | BRI | ATL | RCH | CHI | NHA | DOV | KAN | CLT; 37 | TAL | MAR; 42 | TEX; 23 | PHO | HOM; 15 | 57th | 0^{1} | |
| 2014 | Chip Ganassi Racing | 42 | Chevy | DAY; 38 | PHO; 20 | LVS; 19 | BRI; 10 | CAL; 2 | MAR; 27 | TEX; 5 | DAR; 8 | RCH; 16 | TAL; 9 | KAN; 12 | CLT; 18 | DOV; 11 | POC; 5 | MCH; 8 | SON; 28 | KEN; 40 | DAY; 36 | NHA; 3 | IND; 7 | **POC**; 11 | GLN; 4 | MCH; 43 | BRI; 12 | ATL; 8 | RCH; 11 | CHI; 3 | NHA; 2 | DOV; 6 | KAN; 2 | CLT; 6 | TAL; 17 | MAR; 30 | TEX; 7 | PHO; 13 | HOM; 13 | 17th | 1080 | |
| 2015 | Chip Ganassi Racing | 42 | Chevy | DAY; 34 | ATL; 26 | LVS; 8 | PHO; 10 | CAL; 26 | MAR; QL^{†} | TEX; 25 | BRI; 7 | RCH; 12 | TAL; 42 | KAN; 15 | CLT; 25 | DOV; 3 | POC; 8 | MCH; 17 | SON; 15 | DAY; 39 | KEN; 35 | NHA; 31 | IND; 9 | POC; 12 | GLN; 12 | MCH; 13 | BRI; 41 | DAR; 10 | RCH; 12 | CHI; 7 | NHA; 17 | DOV; 9 | CLT; 21 | KAN; 29 | TAL; 24 | MAR; 19 | TEX; 37 | PHO; 21 | HOM; 5 | 19th | 872 | |
| 2016 | Chip Ganassi Racing | 42 | Chevy | DAY; 7 | ATL; 26 | LVS; 34 | PHO; 12 | CAL; 39 | MAR; 3 | TEX; 14 | BRI; 35 | RCH; 15 | TAL; 29 | KAN; 35 | DOV; 2 | CLT; 13 | POC; 11 | MCH; 3 | SON; 12 | DAY; 6 | KEN; 19 | NHA; 17 | IND; 5 | POC; 6 | GLN; 29 | BRI; 24 | MCH; 1* | DAR; 3 | RCH; 2 | CHI; 18 | NHA; 10 | DOV; 25 | CLT; 5 | KAN; 30 | TAL; 6 | MAR; 14 | TEX; 15 | PHO; 3 | HOM; 2* | 9th | 2288 | |
| 2017 | Chip Ganassi Racing | 42 | Chevy | DAY; 12 | ATL; 2 | LVS; 2 | PHO; 2 | **CAL**; 1* | MAR; 17 | TEX; 2 | BRI; 6* | RCH; 14 | TAL; 12 | KAN; 6 | CLT; 33 | DOV; 2* | POC; 7 | **MCH**; 1* | **SON**; 26 | DAY; 29 | KEN; 2 | NHA; 2 | IND; 28 | POC; 33 | GLN; 23 | MCH; 1 | BRI; 9 | DAR; 14* | RCH; 1 | CHI; 5 | NHA; 2 | DOV; 5 | CLT; 10 | TAL; 13 | KAN; 39 | MAR; 37 | TEX; 37 | PHO; 40 | HOM; 3* | 8th | 2320 | |
| 2018 | Chip Ganassi Racing | 42 | Chevy | DAY; 19 | ATL; 9 | LVS; 3 | PHO; 18 | CAL; 2 | MAR; 16 | TEX; 36 | BRI; 2* | RCH; 7 | TAL; 40 | **DOV**; 10 | KAN; 4* | CLT; 7 | POC; 2 | MCH; 28 | **SON**; 14 | CHI; 2 | DAY; 29 | KEN; 9 | NHA; 12 | POC; 23 | GLN; 6 | MCH; 17 | **BRI**; 2 | DAR; 3* | IND; 14 | LVS; 2 | RCH; 7 | ROV; 25* | DOV; 12 | TAL; 11 | KAN; 3 | MAR; 37 | TEX; 5 | PHO; 3 | HOM; 13 | 9th | 2299 | |
| 2019 | Chip Ganassi Racing | 42 | Chevy | DAY; 7 | ATL; 12* | LVS; 12 | PHO; 6 | CAL; 12 | MAR; 18 | TEX; 39 | BRI; 19 | RCH; 37 | TAL; 24 | DOV; 3 | KAN; 8 | CLT; 33 | POC; 26 | MCH; 14 | **SON**; 10 | CHI; 2 | DAY; 20 | KEN; 4 | NHA; 33 | POC; 5 | GLN; 8 | MCH; 3 | BRI; 6 | DAR; 2 | IND; 33 | LVS; 8 | RCH; 6 | ROV; 13 | DOV; 1 | TAL; 39 | KAN; 14 | MAR; 9 | TEX; 12 | PHO; 4 | HOM; 40 | 6th | 2339 | |
| 2020 | Chip Ganassi Racing | 42 | Chevy | DAY; 10 | LVS; 9 | CAL; 21 | PHO; 4 | DAR | DAR | CLT | CLT | BRI | ATL | MAR | HOM | TAL | POC | POC | IND | KEN | TEX | KAN | NHA | MCH | MCH | DRC | DOV | DOV | DAY | DAR | RCH | BRI | LVS | TAL | ROV | KAN | TEX | MAR | PHO | 34th | 121 | |
| 2021 | Hendrick Motorsports | 5 | Chevy | DAY; 10 | DRC; 30 | HOM; 4 | LVS; 1* | PHO; 7 | ATL; 2* | BRD; 29 | MAR; 5 | RCH; 18 | TAL; 40 | KAN; 19* | DAR; 2 | DOV; 2* | COA; 2 | **CLT**; 1* | SON; 1* | NSH; 1* | POC; 9 | POC; 2 | ROA; 16 | ATL; 18 | NHA; 7 | GLN; 1 | IRC; 3* | MCH; 3* | DAY; 20 | DAR; 2* | RCH; 6 | BRI; 1* | LVS; 10 | TAL; 37 | ROV; 1 | TEX; 1* | KAN; 1* | MAR; 14 | **PHO**; 1* | 1st | 5040 | |
| 2022 | Hendrick Motorsports | 5 | Chevy | **DAY**; 32 | CAL; 1 | LVS; 2 | PHO; 34 | ATL; 30 | COA; 29 | RCH; 5 | MAR; 19 | BRD; 4 | TAL; 4 | DOV; 6 | DAR; 36 | KAN; 2 | CLT; 9 | GTW; 12 | **SON**; 15 | NSH; 4 | ROA; 3 | ATL; 13 | NHA; 14 | POC; 5 | IRC; 35 | MCH; 7 | **RCH**; 14 | GLN; 1 | DAY; 37 | DAR; 12 | KAN; 8 | BRI; 5 | TEX; 9 | TAL; 18 | ROV; 35 | LVS; 35 | HOM; 1* | **MAR**; 2 | PHO; 9 | 7th | 2354 | |
| 2023 | Hendrick Motorsports | 5 | Chevy | DAY; 18 | CAL; 29 | LVS; 2 | **PHO**; 4* | ATL; 31 | COA; 14 | RCH; 1 | **BRD**; 35 | MAR; 1 | TAL; 33 | DOV; 32 | KAN; 2* | DAR; 20 | CLT; 30 | GTW; 4 | SON; 8 | NSH; 5 | CSC; 4 | ATL; 36 | NHA; 3 | POC; 20 | RCH; 19 | MCH; 5 | IRC; 8 | GLN; 26 | DAY; 27 | DAR; 1 | KAN; 4* | BRI; 2 | TEX; 31 | TAL; 15 | ROV; 13 | LVS; 1* | HOM; 34* | MAR; 6 | PHO; 3 | 2nd | 5034 | |
| 2024 | Hendrick Motorsports | 5 | Chevy | DAY; 11 | ATL; 32 | LVS; 1* | PHO; 14 | BRI; 5 | COA; 17 | **RCH**; 3 | **MAR**; 2 | **TEX**; 21* | TAL; 21 | DOV; 2 | KAN; 1 | DAR; 34 | CLT; QL^{‡} | GTW; 10 | SON; 1 | **IOW**; 34 | NHA; 4 | NSH; 8 | **CSC**; 39 | POC; 13 | IND; 1 | RCH; 7 | MCH; 34* | DAY; 21 | DAR; 4* | ATL; 37 | GLN; 12 | BRI; 1* | KAN; 26 | TAL; 4 | ROV; 1* | LVS; 11 | HOM; 13 | MAR; 3 | PHO; 4 | 6th | 2378 | |
| 2025 | Hendrick Motorsports | 5 | Chevy | DAY; 20 | ATL; 3 | COA; 32 | PHO; 3 | LVS; 9* | HOM; 1 | MAR; 5 | DAR; 37 | BRI; 1* | TAL; 2 | TEX; 4* | **KAN**; 1* | CLT; 37 | NSH; 8 | MCH; 5 | MXC; 36 | POC; 7 | ATL; 17 | CSC; 13 | SON; 35 | DOV; 4 | IND; 2 | IOW; 28 | GLN; 39 | RCH; 6 | DAY; 6 | DAR; 19 | GTW; 12 | BRI; 32 | NHA; 7 | KAN; 6 | ROV; 2 | LVS; 2* | TAL; 26 | MAR; 5 | PHO; 3 | 1st | 5034 | |
| 2026 | Hendrick Motorsports | 5 | Chevy | DAY; 16 | ATL; 32 | COA; 6 | PHO; 3 | LVS; 7 | DAR; 32 | MAR; 9 | BRI; 3* | KAN; 2 | TAL; 40 | TEX; 34 | GLN; 23 | CLT; 5 | NSH; 23 | MCH; 4 | POC; 5 | COR; 3 | SON; 4 | CHI; 34 | ATL; 34 | NWS; 15 | IND; 39 | IOW; 33 | RCH; 6 | NHA; 5 | DAY; 31 | DAR; 5* | GTW; 1 | BRI; 2 | KAN; 1* | LVS; 2 | CLT; 6* | PHO; 34 | TAL; 1 | MAR; 9 | HOM; 12 | 1st | 2501 | |
^{†} – Qualified but replaced by Regan Smith · ^{‡} – Qualified but replaced by Justin Allgaier

===== Daytona 500 =====
| Year | Team | Manufacturer | Start | Finish |
|---|---|---|---|---|
| 2014 | Chip Ganassi Racing | Chevrolet | 16 | 38 |
| 2015 | Chip Ganassi Racing | Chevrolet | 29 | 34 |
| 2016 | Chip Ganassi Racing | Chevrolet | 14 | 7 |
| 2017 | Chip Ganassi Racing | Chevrolet | 16 | 12 |
| 2018 | Chip Ganassi Racing | Chevrolet | 38 | 19 |
| 2019 | Chip Ganassi Racing | Chevrolet | 26 | 7 |
| 2020 | Chip Ganassi Racing | Chevrolet | 8 | 10 |
| 2021 | Hendrick Motorsports | Chevrolet | 13 | 10 |
| 2022 | Hendrick Motorsports | Chevrolet | **1** | 32 |
| 2023 | Hendrick Motorsports | Chevrolet | 2 | 18 |
| 2024 | Hendrick Motorsports | Chevrolet | 17 | 11 |
| 2025 | Hendrick Motorsports | Chevrolet | 22 | 20 |
| 2026 | Hendrick Motorsports | Chevrolet | 8 | 16 |

==== O'Reilly Auto Parts Series ====
NASCAR O'Reilly Auto Parts Series results
| Year | Team | No. | Make | 1 | 2 | 3 | 4 | 5 | 6 | 7 | 8 | 9 | 10 | 11 | 12 | 13 | 14 | 15 | 16 | 17 | 18 | 19 | 20 | 21 | 22 | 23 | 24 | 25 | 26 | 27 | 28 | 29 | 30 | 31 | 32 | 33 | NOAPSC | Pts | Ref |
|---|---|---|---|---|---|---|---|---|---|---|---|---|---|---|---|---|---|---|---|---|---|---|---|---|---|---|---|---|---|---|---|---|---|---|---|---|---|---|---|
| 2013 | Turner Scott Motorsports | 32 | Chevy | DAY; 13 | PHO; 13 | LVS; 32 | BRI; 2 | CAL; 6 | TEX; 32 | RCH; 8 | TAL; 38 | DAR; 6 | CLT; 4 | DOV; 10 | IOW; 5 | MCH; 2 | ROA; 7 | KEN; 7 | DAY; 6 | NHA; 14 | CHI; 12 | IND; 11 | IOW; 5 | GLN; 30 | MOH; 14 | BRI; 5 | ATL; 5 | RCH; 14 | CHI; 32 | KEN; 33 | DOV; 2 | KAN; 30 | CLT; 13 | TEX; 9 | PHO; 32 | HOM; 2* | 8th | 995 | |
| 2014 | Turner Scott Motorsports | 42 | Chevy | DAY; 10 | PHO; 4 | LVS; 3 | **BRI**; 2 | CAL; 1 | TEX; 3 | DAR; 6 | RCH; 4 | TAL; 30 | IOW | CLT; 1* | DOV; 6 | MCH; 8* | ROA | KEN; 9 | DAY; 5 | NHA; 4 | CHI; 3 | IND; 8 | IOW | GLN; 15 | MOH | BRI; 26 | ATL; 3 | RCH; 13 | CHI; 2 | KEN | DOV; 6 | KAN; 30 | CLT; 5 | TEX; 12 | PHO; 13 | HOM; 3* | 80th | 0^{1} | |
| 2015 | HScott Motorsports | 42 | Chevy | DAY; 8 | ATL; 10 | LVS | PHO | CAL; 7 | TEX | BRI | RCH | TAL | IOW | CLT; 33 | DOV | MCH; 3 | CHI | DAY | KEN | NHA | IND; 7 | IOW | GLN; 28 | MOH | BRI; 2 | ROA | DAR; 7 | RCH | CHI; 22 | KEN | DOV; 5 | CLT | KAN | TEX; 33 | PHO; 15 | HOM; 1* | 87th | 0^{1} | |
| 2016 | Chip Ganassi Racing | 42 | Chevy | DAY; 34 | ATL; 2 | LVS | PHO | CAL; 8 | TEX; 11 | BRI; 3* | RCH | TAL | DOV | CLT; 6 | POC; 1* | MCH | IOW | DAY | KEN | NHA | IND; 4 | IOW | GLN; 3 | MOH | BRI; 3* | ROA | DAR; 4 | RCH | CHI; 2 | KEN | DOV | CLT; 4* | KAN; 5 | TEX; 1 | PHO | HOM; 7 | 87th | 0^{1} | |
| 2017 | Chip Ganassi Racing | 42 | Chevy | DAY | ATL; 3 | LVS; 2 | PHO | CAL; 1 | TEX | **BRI**; 7* | RCH; 1 | TAL | CLT | **DOV**; 1* | POC; 3 | MCH | IOW | DAY | KEN | NHA; 4 | IND | IOW | GLN; 40 | MOH | BRI | ROA | DAR | RCH | CHI; 2 | KEN | DOV | CLT | KAN | TEX; 3 | PHO | HOM | 86th | 0^{1} | |
| 2018 | Chip Ganassi Racing | 42 | Chevy | DAY; 29* | ATL | LVS; 1* | PHO | CAL | TEX | BRI | RCH | TAL | DOV | CLT | POC | MCH | IOW | **CHI**; 1* | DAY; 1* | KEN | NHA | IOW | GLN; 27 | MOH | BRI; 1* | ROA | DAR | IND | LVS | RCH | ROV | DOV | KAN | TEX | PHO | HOM | 83rd | 0^{1} | |
| 2022 | Hendrick Motorsports | 17 | Chevy | DAY | CAL | LVS | PHO | ATL | COA | RCH | MAR | TAL | DOV | DAR | TEX | CLT | PIR | NSH | **ROA**; 2* | ATL | NHA | POC | IRC | MCH | | | DAR; 5 | KAN | BRI | TEX | TAL | ROV | LVS | HOM | MAR | PHO | 74th | 0^{1} | |
| 2022 | JR Motorsports | 88 | Chevy | | | | | | | | | | | | | | | | | | | | | | GLN; 1 | DAY | | | | | | | | | | | 74th | 0^{1} | |
| 2023 | Kaulig Racing | 10 | Chevy | DAY | CAL | LVS | PHO | ATL | COA | RCH | MAR | TAL | DOV | DAR; 1 | CLT | PIR | | | | | | | | | | | | | | | | | | | | | 75th | 0^{1} | |
| 2023 | Hendrick Motorsports | 17 | Chevy | | | | | | | | | | | | | | **SON**; 3* | NSH | CSC | ATL | NHA | POC | ROA | MCH | IRC | GLN | DAY | DAR; 38 | KAN | BRI | TEX | ROV | LVS | HOM | MAR | PHO | 75th | 0^{1} | |
| 2024 | Hendrick Motorsports | 17 | Chevy | DAY | ATL | LVS | PHO | **COA**; 1 | RCH | MAR | TEX | TAL | DOV | DAR | CLT | PIR | SON | IOW | NHA | NSH | CSC; 3 | POC | IND | MCH | DAY | DAR | ATL | GLN | BRI | KAN | TAL | ROV | LVS | HOM | MAR | PHO | 79th | 0^{1} | |
| 2025 | Hendrick Motorsports | 17 | Chevy | DAY | ATL | COA | PHO | LVS | HOM; 4* | MAR | DAR | **BRI**; 1* | CAR | TAL | | | | | | | | | | IND; 4 | IOW | GLN | DAY | PIR | GTW | BRI | KAN | ROV | LVS | TAL | MAR | PHO | 76th | 0^{1} | |
| 2025 | JR Motorsports | 88 | Chevy | | | | | | | | | | | | TEX; 1 | CLT | NSH | MXC | POC | ATL | CSC | SON | DOV | | | | | | | | | | | | | | 76th | 0^{1} | |
| 2026 | JR Motorsports | 88 | Chevy | DAY | ATL | COA | PHO | LVS; 1 | **DAR**; 4* | MAR | CAR | BRI; 2* | KAN | TAL | TEX; 1* | GLN | DOV | CLT | NSH; 8 | POC | COR | SON | CHI | ATL | IND | IOW | DAY | DAR | GTW | BRI | LVS | CLT | PHO | TAL | MAR | HOM | 69th | 0^{1} | |

==== Craftsman Truck Series ====
NASCAR Craftsman Truck Series results
| Year | Team | No. | Make | 1 | 2 | 3 | 4 | 5 | 6 | 7 | 8 | 9 | 10 | 11 | 12 | 13 | 14 | 15 | 16 | 17 | 18 | 19 | 20 | 21 | 22 | 23 | 24 | 25 | NCTC | Pts | Ref |
|---|---|---|---|---|---|---|---|---|---|---|---|---|---|---|---|---|---|---|---|---|---|---|---|---|---|---|---|---|---|---|---|
| 2012 | Turner Motorsports | 4 | Chevy | DAY | MAR | CAR | KAN | CLT | DOV | TEX | KEN; 10 | IOW | CHI | POC | MCH | BRI | ATL; 6 | IOW | KEN | LVS | TAL | MAR | TEX | PHO; 2 | HOM; 27* | | | | 35th | 134 | |
| 2013 | Turner Scott Motorsports | 30 | Chevy | DAY | MAR | CAR; 1* | KAN | CLT | DOV | TEX | KEN | IOW | ELD; 2 | POC | MCH | BRI | MSP | IOW | CHI | LVS | TAL | MAR | TEX | PHO | HOM | | | | 85th | 0^{1} | |
| 2014 | Turner Scott Motorsports | 32 | Chevy | DAY | MAR | KAN | CLT | DOV | TEX | GTW | KEN | IOW | ELD; 26 | **POC**; 18 | MCH | BRI | MSP | CHI | NHA | LVS | TAL | MAR | TEX | PHO | | | | | 92nd | 0^{1} | |
| 2014 | Turner Scott Motorsports | 42 | Chevy | | | | | | | | | | | | | | | | | | | | | | **HOM**; 2* | | | | 92nd | 0^{1} | |
| 2015 | JR Motorsports | 00 | Chevy | DAY | ATL | MAR | KAN | CLT | DOV | TEX | GTW | IOW | KEN | ELD | POC | MCH | BRI | MSP | CHI; 7 | NHA | LVS | TAL | MAR | TEX | PHO | HOM | | | 93rd | 0^{1} | |
| 2016 | GMS Racing | 24 | Chevy | DAY | ATL | MAR; 4 | KAN | DOV | CLT | TEX | IOW | GTW | KEN | ELD; 1 | POC | BRI | MCH | MSP | CHI | NHA | LVS | TAL | MAR | TEX | PHO | HOM; 4* | | | 82nd | 0^{1} | |
| 2021 | Niece Motorsports | 44 | Chevy | DAY | DRC | LVS | ATL | BRD; 35 | RCH | KAN | DAR | COA | CLT | TEX | NSH | POC | KNX | GLN | GTW | DAR | BRI | LVS | TAL | MAR | PHO | | | | 115th | 0^{1} | |
| 2023 | Spire Motorsports | 7 | Chevy | DAY | LVS | ATL | COA | TEX | BRD | MAR | KAN | DAR | NWS; 1* | CLT | GTW | NSH | MOH | POC | RCH | IRP | MLW | KAN | BRI | TAL | HOM | PHO | | | 86th | 0^{1} | |
| 2025 | Spire Motorsports | 07 | Chevy | DAY | ATL | LVS | HOM; 1 | MAR | BRI; 2 | CAR | TEX | KAN | NWS | CLT | NSH | MCH | POC | LRP | IRP | GLN | RCH | DAR | BRI | NHA | ROV | TAL | MAR | PHO | 77th | 0^{1} | |

^{*} Season still in progress
^{1} Ineligible for series points

=== ARCA Racing Series ===
(key) (Bold – Pole position awarded by qualifying time. Italics – Pole position earned by points standings or practice time. * – Most laps led.)

ARCA Racing Series results
| Year | Team | No. | Make | 1 | 2 | 3 | 4 | 5 | 6 | 7 | 8 | 9 | 10 | 11 | 12 | 13 | 14 | 15 | 16 | 17 | 18 | 19 | 20 | 21 | ARSC | Pts | Ref |
|---|---|---|---|---|---|---|---|---|---|---|---|---|---|---|---|---|---|---|---|---|---|---|---|---|---|---|---|
| 2012 | Eddie Sharp Racing | 6 | Chevy | DAY | MOB | SLM | TAL | TOL | ELK | POC | MCH; 13 | WIN | NJE | IOW | CHI | IRP | POC | BLN | ISF | MAD | SLM | DSF | KAN | | 102nd | 165 | |
| 2013 | Turner Scott Motorsports | 4 | Chevy | DAY; 2 | MOB | SLM | TAL | TOL | ELK | POC | MCH | ROA | WIN | CHI | NJE | POC | BLN | ISF | MAD | DSF | IOW | SLM | KEN | KAN | 95th | 220 | |
| 2014 | Turner Scott Motorsports | 4 | Chevy | DAY | MOB | SLM | TAL | TOL | NJE | **POC**; 1* | MCH | ELK | WIN | CHI | IRP | POC | BLN | ISF | MAD | DSF | SLM | KEN | KAN | | 66th | 250 | |

==== K&N Pro Series East ====
NASCAR K&N Pro Series East results
| Year | Team | No. | Make | 1 | 2 | 3 | 4 | 5 | 6 | 7 | 8 | 9 | 10 | 11 | 12 | 13 | 14 | NKNPSEC | Pts | Ref |
|---|---|---|---|---|---|---|---|---|---|---|---|---|---|---|---|---|---|---|---|---|
| 2012 | Rev Racing | 6 | Toyota | BRI; 9 | GRE; 17 | RCH; 4 | | **BGS**; 5 | JFC; 1 | LGY; 7 | CNB; 2 | COL; 21 | IOW; 2 | NHA; 1 | DOV; 5 | GRE; 4 | CAR; 6 | 1st | 536 | |
| 2012 | Rev Racing | 69 | Toyota | | | | IOW; 6 | | | | | | | | | | | 1st | 536 | |

==== K&N Pro Series West ====
NASCAR K&N Pro Series West results
| Year | Team | No. | Make | 1 | 2 | 3 | 4 | 5 | 6 | 7 | 8 | 9 | 10 | 11 | 12 | 13 | 14 | NKNPSWC | Pts | Ref |
|---|---|---|---|---|---|---|---|---|---|---|---|---|---|---|---|---|---|---|---|---|
| 2014 | Turner Scott Motorsports | 42 | Chevy | PHO | IRW | S99 | IOW | KCR | **SON**; 1** | SLS | CNS | IOW | EVG | KCR | MMP | AAS | PHO | 47th | 48 | |

==== CARS Late Model Stock Car Tour ====
(key) (Bold – Pole position awarded by qualifying time. Italics – Pole position earned by points standings or practice time. * – Most laps led. ** – All laps led.)

CARS Late Model Stock Car Tour results
| Year | Team | No. | Make | 1 | 2 | 3 | 4 | 5 | 6 | 7 | 8 | 9 | 10 | 11 | 12 | 13 | 14 | 15 | 16 | CLMSCTC | Pts | Ref |
|---|---|---|---|---|---|---|---|---|---|---|---|---|---|---|---|---|---|---|---|---|---|---|
| 2023 | JR Motorsports | 5 | Chevy | SNM | FLC | HCY | ACE | NWS | LGY | DOM | CRW; 7 | HCY | ACE | TCM | WKS | AAS | SBO | TCM | CRW | 42nd | 27 | |

=== Complete WeatherTech SportsCar Championship results ===
(key) (Races in bold indicate pole position) (Races in italics indicate fastest lap)

| Year | Team | Class | Make | Engine | 1 | 2 | 3 | 4 | 5 | 6 | 7 | 8 | 9 | 10 | 11 | Pos. | Points | Ref |
|---|---|---|---|---|---|---|---|---|---|---|---|---|---|---|---|---|---|---|
| 2014 | Chip Ganassi Racing | P | Ford EcoBoost Riley DP | Ford Ecoboost 3.5 L V6 Turbo | DAY; 8 | SEB | LBH | LGA | DET | WGL | MOS | IMS | ELK | COA | PET | 46th | 24 | |
| 2015 | Chip Ganassi Racing | P | Ford EcoBoost Riley DP | Ford Ecoboost 3.5 L V6 Turbo | DAY; 1 | SEB | LBH | LAG | DET | WGL | MOS | ROA | COA | PET | | 23rd | 36 | |
| 2016 | Chip Ganassi Racing | P | Ford EcoBoost Riley DP | Ford Ecoboost 3.5 L V6 Turbo | DAY; 7 | SEB | LBH | LAG | DET | WGL | MOS | ROA | COA | PET | | 29th | 25 | |

==== 24 Hours of Daytona ====
24 Hours of Daytona results
| Year | Class | No | Team | Car | Co-drivers | Laps | Position | Class Pos. | Ref |
|---|---|---|---|---|---|---|---|---|---|
| 2014 | P | 02 | (United States) Chip Ganassi Racing | Ford Riley DP | (New Zealand) Scott Dixon (Brazil) Tony Kanaan (United Kingdom) Marino Franchitti | 667 | 15 ^{DNF} | 8 ^{DNF} | |
| 2015 | P | 02 | (United States) Chip Ganassi Racing | Ford Riley DP | (New Zealand) Scott Dixon (Brazil) Tony Kanaan (United States) Jamie McMurray | 740 | 1 | 1 | |
| 2016 | P | 02 | (United States) Chip Ganassi Racing | Ford Riley DP | (New Zealand) Scott Dixon (Brazil) Tony Kanaan (United States) Jamie McMurray | 708 | 13 | 7 | |

=== American open-wheel results ===
==== IndyCar Series ====
(key) (Races in bold indicate pole position; races in italics indicate fastest lap)

| Year | Team | No. | Chassis | Engine | 1 | 2 | 3 | 4 | 5 | 6 | 7 | 8 | 9 | 10 | 11 | 12 | 13 | 14 | 15 | 16 | 17 | 18 | Rank | Points | Ref |
|---|---|---|---|---|---|---|---|---|---|---|---|---|---|---|---|---|---|---|---|---|---|---|---|---|---|
| 2024 | Arrow McLaren/Rick Hendrick | 17 | Dallara DW12 | Chevrolet | STP | THE | LBH | ALA | IMS | INDY; 18 | DET | ROA | LAG | MOH | IOW | IOW | TOR | GTW | POR | MIL | MIL | NSH | 36th | 21 | |
| 2025 | Arrow McLaren/Rick Hendrick | 17 | Dallara DW12 | Chevrolet | STP | THE | LBH | ALA | IMS | INDY; 24 | DET | GTW | ROA | MOH | IOW | IOW | TOR | LAG | POR | MIL | NSH | | 33rd | 6 | |

==== Indianapolis 500 ====
| Year | Chassis | Engine | Start | Finish | Team |
|---|---|---|---|---|---|
| 2024 | Dallara | Chevrolet | 5 | 18 | Arrow McLaren/Rick Hendrick |
| 2025 | Dallara | Chevrolet | 19 | 24 | Arrow McLaren/Rick Hendrick |

== See also ==
- Kyle Larson Racing
- Kyle Larson vs. The Double (2026)

Sporting positions
| Preceded by Chase Elliott; Joey Logano; Kyle Larson | NASCAR Cup Series Champion; 2021; 2025; 2026 | Succeeded by Joey Logano; Kyle Larson; Incumbent |
| Preceded by Max Gresham | NASCAR K&N Pro Series East Champion; 2012 | Succeeded by Dylan Kwasniewski |
Achievements
| Preceded by Kevin Harvick | Brickyard 400 winner 2024 | Succeeded by Bubba Wallace |
| Preceded by Erik Jones | Cook Out Southern 500 Winner; 2023 | Succeeded by Chase Briscoe |
| Preceded by Brad Keselowski | Coca-Cola 600 Winner; 2021 | Succeeded by Denny Hamlin |
| Preceded by Kevin Harvick; Chase Elliott | NASCAR All-Star Race Winner; 2019; 2021; 2023 | Succeeded by Chase Elliott; Ryan Blaney; Joey Logano |
| Preceded by Alex Bowman | NASCAR K&N Pro Series East Rookie of the Year; 2012 | Succeeded by Jesse Little |
| Preceded by Austin Dillon | NASCAR Nationwide Series Rookie of the Year; 2013 | Succeeded by Chase Elliott |
| Preceded by Ricky Stenhouse Jr. | NASCAR Sprint Cup Series Rookie of the Year; 2014 | Succeeded by Brett Moffitt |
| Preceded by Benjamin Pedersen | Indianapolis 500; Rookie of the Year; 2024 | Succeeded by Robert Shwartzman |
