= 2020 Drydene 311 =

The 2020 Drydene 311 refers to two NASCAR Cup Series races at Dover International Speedway that were created as a result of the COVID-19 pandemic:

- 2020 Drydene 311 (Saturday), held on August 22
- 2020 Drydene 311 (Sunday), held on August 23
