= Ty Dillon =

American racing driver (born 1992)

- Dillon at Las Vegas Motor Speedway in 2026
- Born: Ty Reed Dillon; February 27, 1992 (age 34); Welcome, North Carolina, U.S.
- Height: 5 ft 10 in (1.78 m)
- Weight: 185 lb (84 kg)
- Achievements: 2011 ARCA Racing Series Champion; 2014 DIRTcar Nationals UMP Modified Champion; 2008 Patriot Nationals Winner
- Awards: 2012 NASCAR Camping World Truck Series Rookie of the Year; 2013 NASCAR Camping World Truck Series Most Popular Driver

NASCAR Cup Series career
- 317 races run over 13 years
- Car no., team: No. 10 (Kaulig Racing)
- 2026 position: 34th
- Best finish: 24th (2017, 2019)
- First race: 2014 Oral-B USA 500 (Atlanta)
- Last race: 2026 Season Finale 400 (Homestead)
Wins	Top tens	Poles
0	8	0

NASCAR O'Reilly Auto Parts Series career
- 165 races run over 11 years
- 2024 position: 109th
- Best finish: 3rd (2015)
- First race: 2012 5-hour Energy 200 (Dover)
- Last race: 2024 Focused Health 250 (COTA)
- First win: 2014 Lilly Diabetes 250 (Indianapolis)
Wins	Top tens	Poles
1	92	4

NASCAR FedEx Freight Truck Series career
- 78 races run over 10 years
- 2026 position: 109th
- Best finish: 2nd (2013)
- First race: 2011 Kentucky 225 (Kentucky)
- Last race: 2026 Black's Tire 200 (Rockingham)
- First win: 2012 Jeff Foxworthy's Grit Chips 200 (Atlanta)
- Last win: 2013 WinStar World Casino 350K (Texas)
Wins	Top tens	Poles
3	38	5

NASCAR Canada Series career
- 2 races run over 1 year
- 2013 position: 42nd
- Best finish: 42nd (2013)
- First race: 2013 Pinty's Presents the Vortex 200 (Mosport)
- Last race: 2013 Pinty's Presents the Clarington 200 (Mosport)
Wins	Top tens	Poles
0	1	0

ARCA Menards Series career
- 22 races run over 2 years
- Best finish: 1st (2011)
- First race: 2010 Prairie Meadows 200 (Iowa)
- Last race: 2011 Federated Car Care 200 (Toledo)
- First win: 2010 Kansas Lottery 150 (Kansas)
- Last win: 2011 Pennsylvania ARCA 125 (Pocono)
Wins	Top tens	Poles
9	19	8

ARCA Menards Series East career
- 11 races run over 2 years
- Best finish: 13th (2010)
- First race: 2009 South Boston 150 (South Boston)
- Last race: 2010 Sunoco 150 (Dover)
- First win: 2010 American Fence Association 150 (Jefferson)
Wins	Top tens	Poles
1	6	0

ARCA Menards Series West career
- 2 races run over 2 years
- Best finish: 55th (2010)
- First race: 2010 3 Amigos Tequila 125 (Phoenix)
- Last race: 2011 3 Amigos Organic Blanco 150 (Phoenix)
Wins	Top tens	Poles
0	2	0
- Statistics up to date as of November 8, 2026.

Ty Reed Dillon (born February 27, 1992) is an American professional stock car racing driver. He competes full-time in the NASCAR Cup Series, driving the No. 10 Dodge for Kaulig Racing. He has also competed in what is now the NASCAR O'Reilly Auto Parts Series and the NASCAR Craftsman Truck Series, as well as the ARCA Menards Series, what are now the ARCA Menards Series East and West, and what is now known as the NASCAR Canada Series in the past.

Dillon is the 2011 ARCA Racing Series champion and was the series' youngest champion at nineteen years, seven months, and nineteen days until Ty Gibbs broke this record when he won the 2021 ARCA Menards Series championship at nineteen years, zero months, and nineteen days.

Dillon has spent most of his NASCAR career driving for Richard Childress Racing and affiliated teams. RCR is owned by his grandfather Richard Childress. He is the younger brother of fellow NASCAR driver Austin Dillon, who drives RCR's No. 3 Cup Series car full-time. His father is RCR general manager Mike Dillon, who is a retired NASCAR driver.

== Racing career ==
=== Early career ===
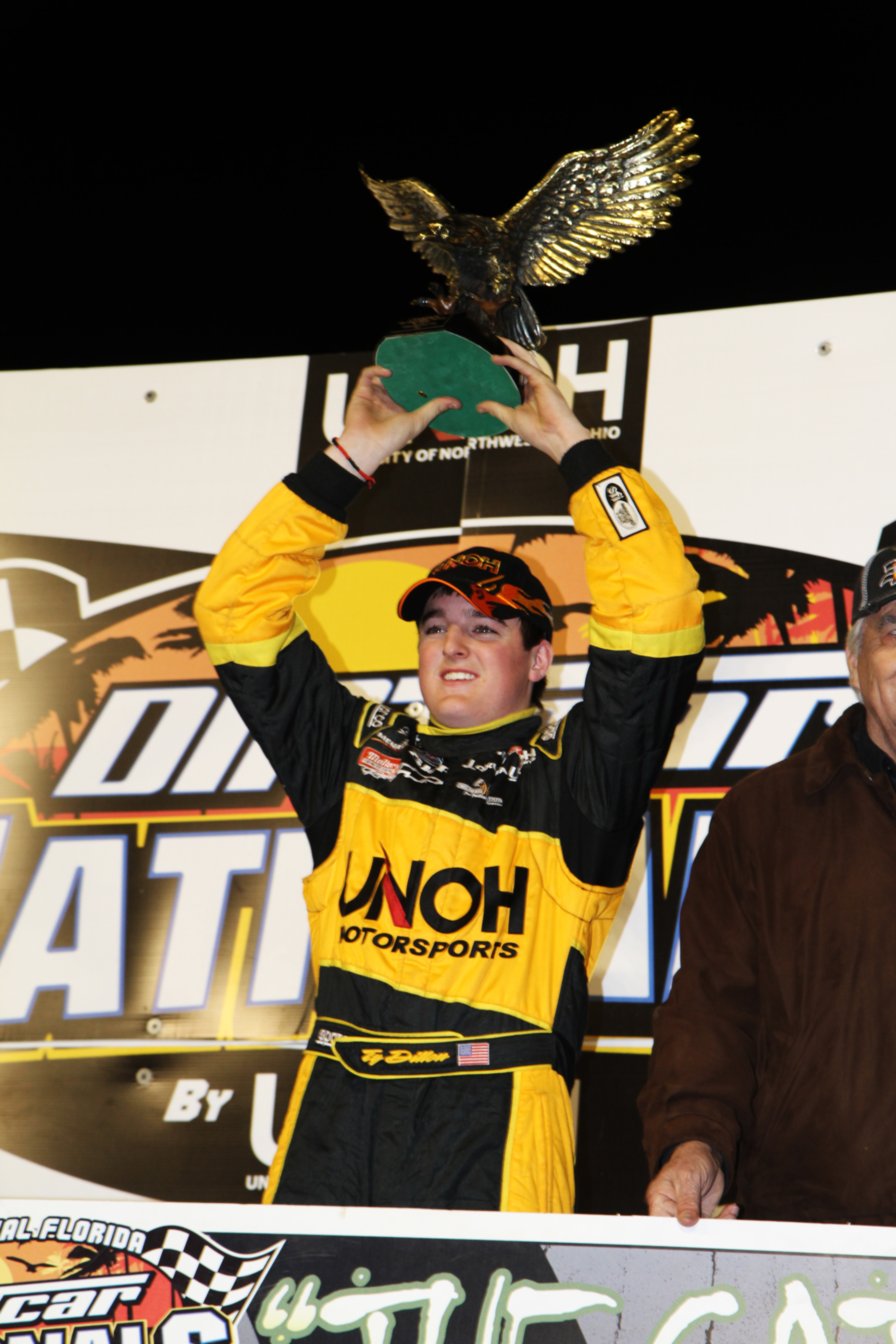
Dillon at the 2011 UNOH Dirtcar Nationals

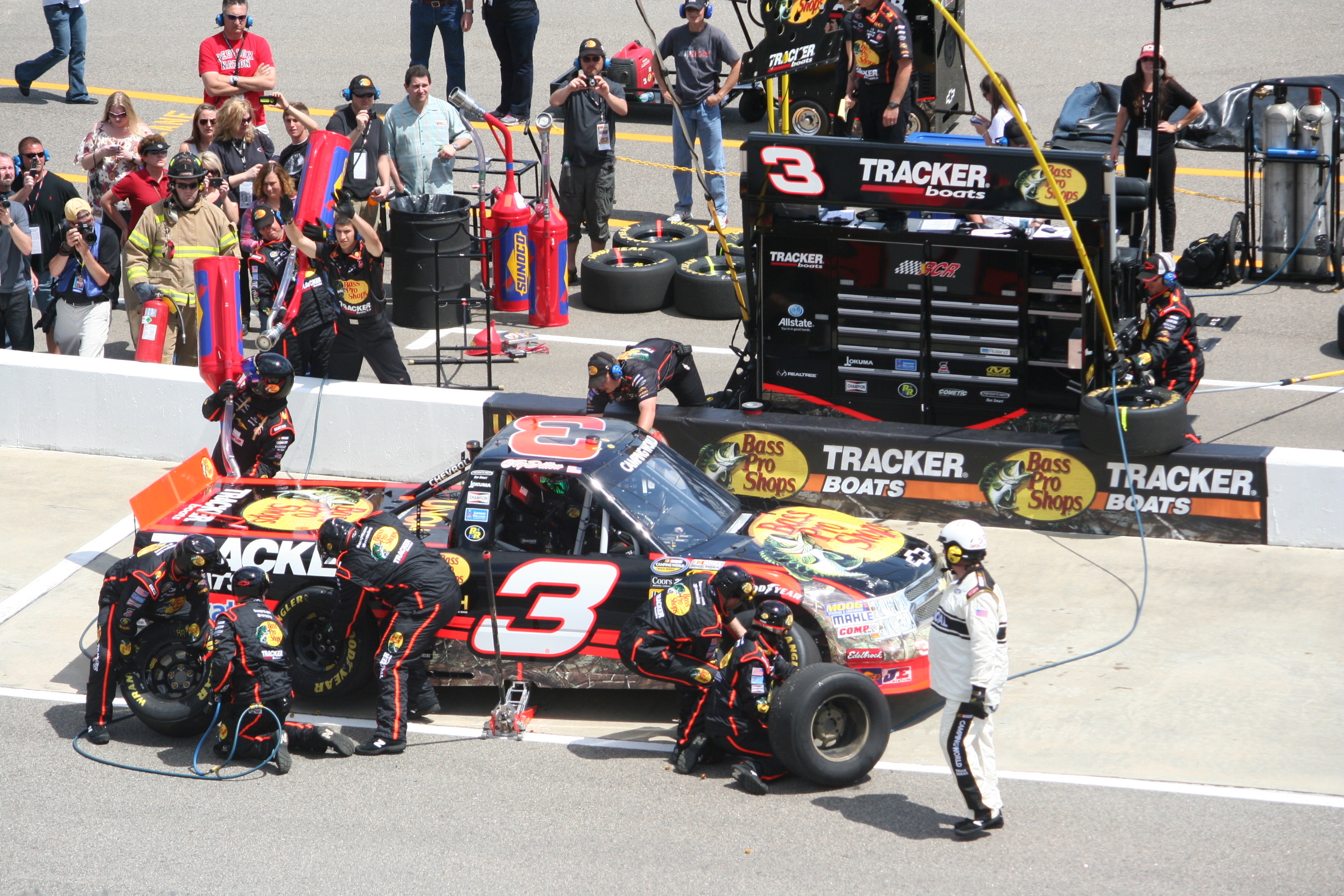
Dillon at Rockingham in 2012

Dillon began his racing career in go-karts and Bandoleros. Moving up to the K&N Pro Series East in 2009, he competed for the series championship in 2010, finishing thirteenth in points despite only competing in eight races of the series ten-race schedule. He scored one win in the series, in August 2010 at Gresham Motorsports Park.

After making three starts and winning twice, at Kansas Speedway and Rockingham Speedway, in the ARCA Racing Series in 2010, Dillon ran his first full season in the series in 2011, winning seven times on his way to winning the series championship. He defeated Chris Buescher by a 340-point margin for the championship, but lost the series rookie-of-the-year award to Buescher by two points.

=== NASCAR ===
==== Craftsman Truck Series ====
Dillon made his debut in the Camping World Truck Series in 2011, finishing eighteenth at Kentucky Speedway, in preparation for running the full series schedule for Richard Childress Racing in 2012. In only his second Truck Series start at Texas Motor Speedway, he finished third. At Homestead, he finished sixth, right in front of his brother Austin, who was crowned champion that night after the race was called due to rain.

In the 2012 NextEra Energy Resources 250 at Daytona, he finished ninth. The following race at Martinsville saw Dillon score his best career finish, 2nd, finishing behind teammate Kevin Harvick. He recorded top-ten finishes in each of the first five Truck Series races of the year. On August 31, he scored his first career Truck Series win at Atlanta Motor Speedway.

Returning to the Camping World Truck Series in 2013, Dillon went on to win at Kentucky Speedway in the Camping World Truck Series on June 27 of that year. In late August 2013, Dillon was leading the final lap of the Truck Series' first race in Canada against seventeen-year-old rookie Chase Elliott. In the final turn, Dillon and Elliott made contact, with Dillon winding up hitting the tire barrier and Elliott winning the race. Dillon afterward stated that the next time they raced each other "he won't finish the race". At Texas, Dillon won the 100th race for a No. 3 car/truck in NASCAR.

Dillon finished second in the 2013 NASCAR Camping World Truck Series standings, behind Matt Crafton; he was named the series' Most Popular Driver at the season-ending awards banquet.

Part-time (2014–2021)

In 2014, Dillon returned to the Truck Series for the Mudsummer Classic at Eldora Speedway, racing the same truck he had driven in the previous year's race. Dillon finished 5th in the event. Dillon later entered the final race of the season in the No. 9 for NTS Motorsports in place of Brennan Newberry, finishing 7th.

In 2015, Dillon drove three races in the No. 33 Chevrolet for GMS Racing at Daytona, Atlanta, and Eldora, where he earned two top-tens in these races. Dillon drove one race in the No. 31 Chevrolet for NTS Motorsports at Bristol, where he crashed late in the race.

Dillon returned to the CWTS in 2017 at Martinsville, driving the No. 99 Chevrolet Silverado for MDM Motorsports and finished fifth. Dillon also ran at Eldora for the Mudsummer Classic, finishing twelfth.

Rackley W.A.R. (2024)

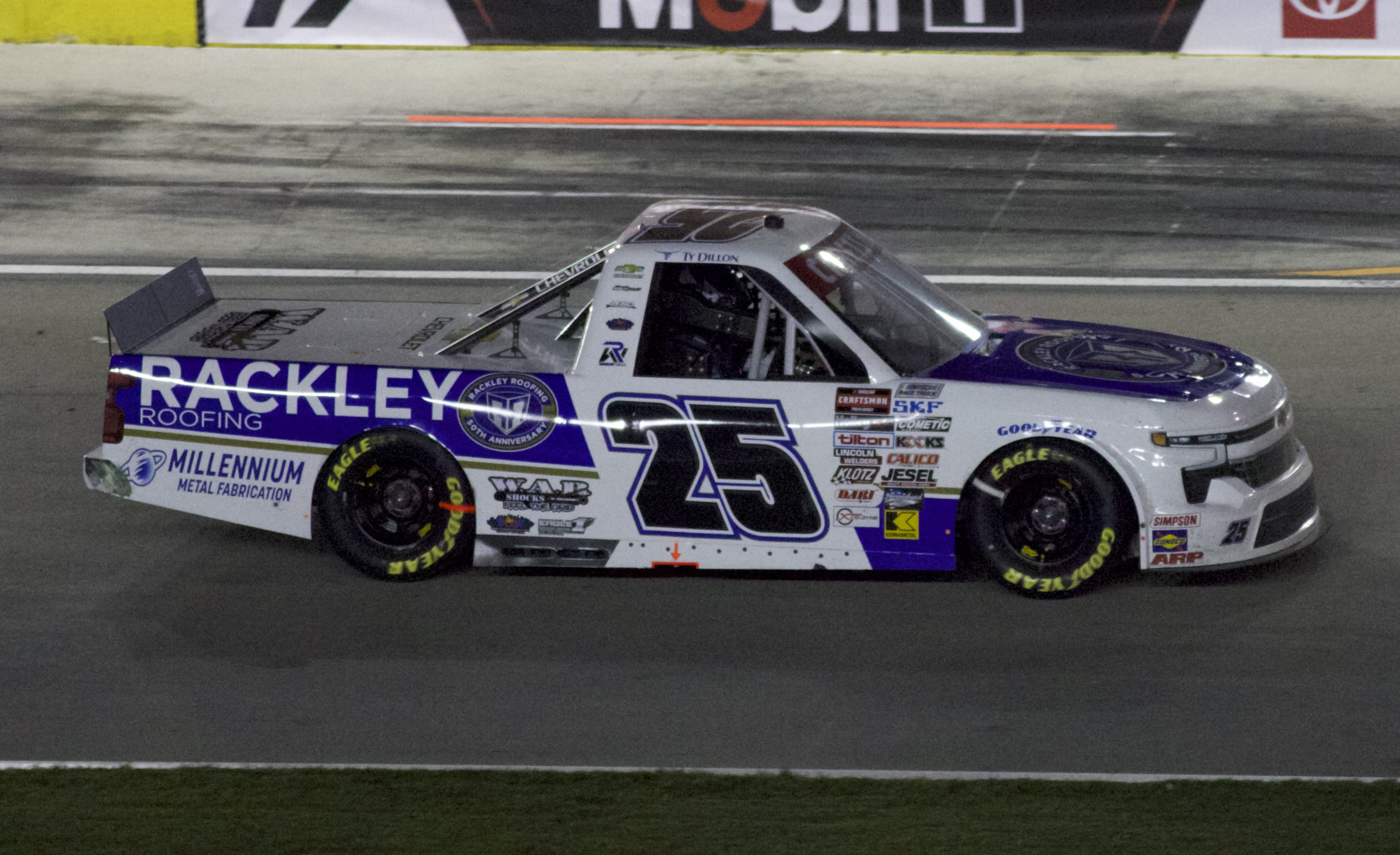
Dillon's No. 25 truck at Las Vegas Motor Speedway in 2024.

On December 29, 2023, Rackley W.A.R. announced that Dillon would drive the No. 25 truck full-time in 2024, his first full truck season since 2013. Dillon stepped out of the seat prior to the Kansas race in favor of Dawson Sutton, with Dillon assuming role as his coach and mentor.

Kaulig Racing (2026)

On February 13, 2026, Kaulig announced that Dillon would run in the No. 25 Ram 1500 at Atlanta, an "all-star" seat.

Dillon would race at Rockingham during the Cup Series' bye week, after the original scheduled driver, Corey LaJoie, would drive the No. 10 in the truck series, replacing a suspended Daniel Dye.

==== Xfinity Series ====
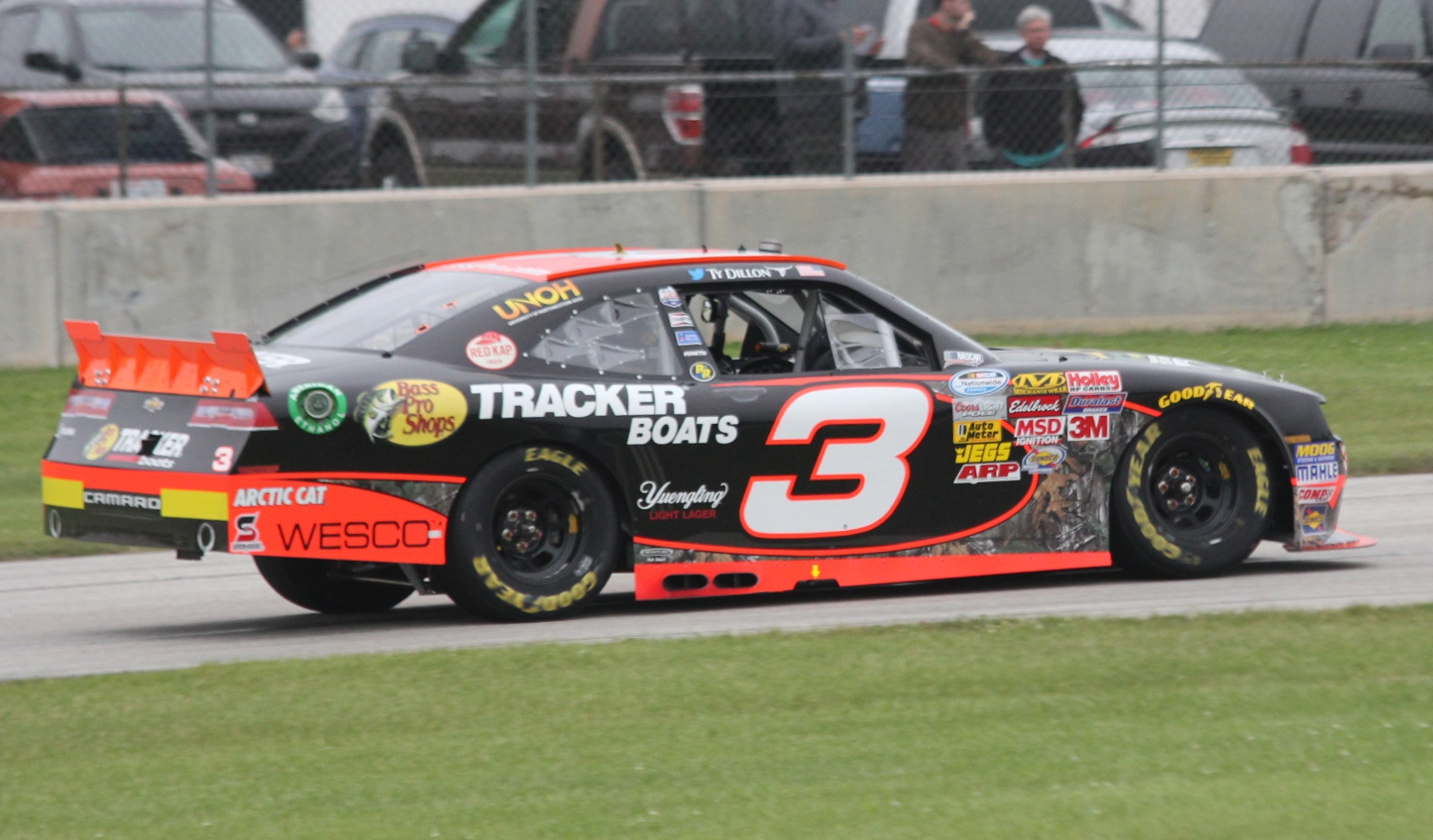
Dillon at Road America in 2014

In early June 2012, Dillon made his debut in the Nationwide Series in the 5-hour Energy 200 at Dover International Speedway. In July, he finished third in the first Nationwide Series race held at Indianapolis Motor Speedway. In August 2013, it was announced that Dillon would be moving full-time to the Nationwide Series for 2014, where he would drive the No. 3 Chevrolet for RCR, replacing brother Austin.

Dillon won his first career Nationwide Series pole at Las Vegas. He won a second pole in Kentucky. His third career pole came at Kansas.

On July 26, 2014, at Indianapolis Motor Speedway, Dillon got by Kyle Busch on the final restart and held off Busch to win the race. Dillon finished 2nd to Chase Elliott in the 2014 NNS Rookie of the Year standings.

In 2015, Dillon began with a third-place finish at the season opener at Daytona. On August 8, 2015, at Watkins Glen, Dillon was involved in a huge fight with Regan Smith when Dillon dumped Smith in turn one and caused Smith to finish in the 20th position. Despite having no wins, Ty Dillon finished a career-best third-place in the final point standings for 2015 with a career-high in top-tens (25) and top-fives (twelve).

In 2016, at the season-opening race at Daytona, Dillon scored his fourth career Xfinity Series pole and his first since the 2014 season. Dillon brought home a $100,000 bonus by winning the Dash 4 Cash at Richmond, finishing second, after the three other Dash 4 Cash drivers all crashed out of the race in the same wreck, late in the going. He finished 2nd to Dale Earnhardt Jr. in the race. Coming back to Daytona, Dillon drove a very special Bass Pro Shops/NRA Museum paint scheme for the July 4th weekend, in which he finished 14th.

For 2016, NASCAR used the Chase format in the Xfinity Series. Dillon made the Chase in 2016 on points but was eliminated after a close battle with Justin Allgaier. Dillon finished fifth in points for 2016 with five season-best second-place finishes (Richmond, both Iowa races, Dover during the chase, and Homestead).

Dillon ran 27 Xfinity races in 2017; he did not run the Iowa races in June and July, Road America, Mid-Ohio, Kentucky in September, or Homestead. Although he moved up full-time to the Cup Series in 2017, Dillon continued to drive the No. 3 Chevrolet Camaro for RCR, but now, he drove on a part-time basis. At the Xfinity opener at Daytona, Dillon was running up front until the last restart, when he ran out of fuel and finished 19th. After two more bad finishes, Dillon began a four-race streak of Top 10 finishes. He ended the season with sixteen top-tens.

In 2018, Dillon ran a few Xfinity races in the No. 3 Camaro as other drivers were sharing the same ride. He did not run any races in the series in 2019 and 2020.

On January 27, 2021, it was announced that Dillon would drive for Joe Gibbs Racing in their No. 54 Toyota part-time in the Xfinity Series in 2021, running the season opener at Daytona, Homestead, Las Vegas, and Talladega in the spring. He joined Our Motorsports for the Charlotte race in May.

==== Cup Series ====
Part-time (2014–2016)

On July 15, 2014, RCR announced Dillon would make his Sprint Cup Series debut in the No. 33 with Hillman-Circle Sport LLC in partnership with RCR in the Oral-B USA 500 at Atlanta Motor Speedway. After qualifying 29th, he finished 25th. Dillon returned to the No. 33 for the Quicken Loans Race for Heroes 500 at Phoenix International Raceway, qualifying 26th and finishing 27th.

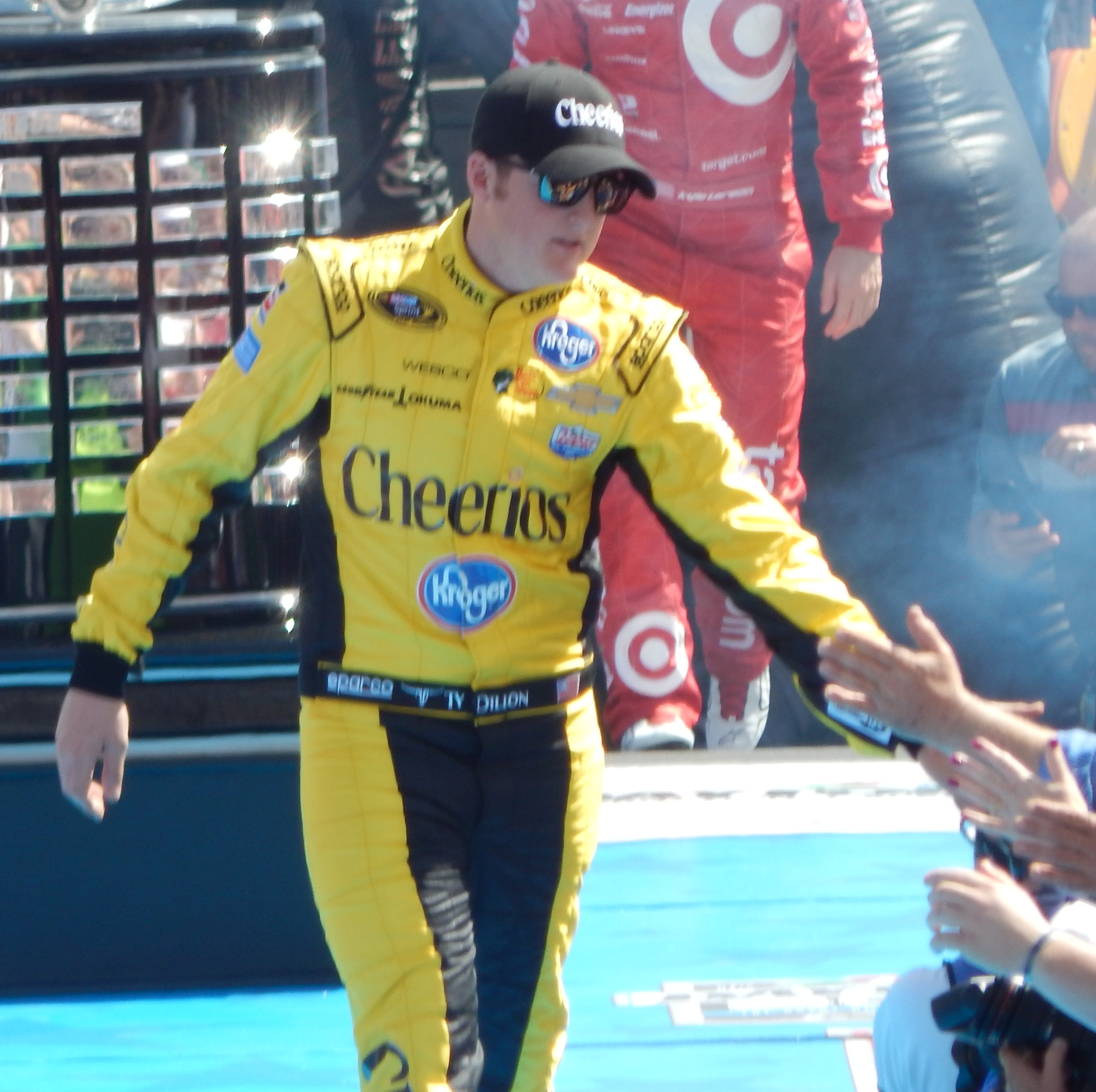
Dillon at the 2015 Daytona 500

In September 2014, sponsor Yuengling and RCR announced they would field the No. 33 for Dillon at the 2015 June Pocono race. On December 9, RCR stated Dillon would drive the No. 33 for Hillman-Circle Sport in the Daytona 500.

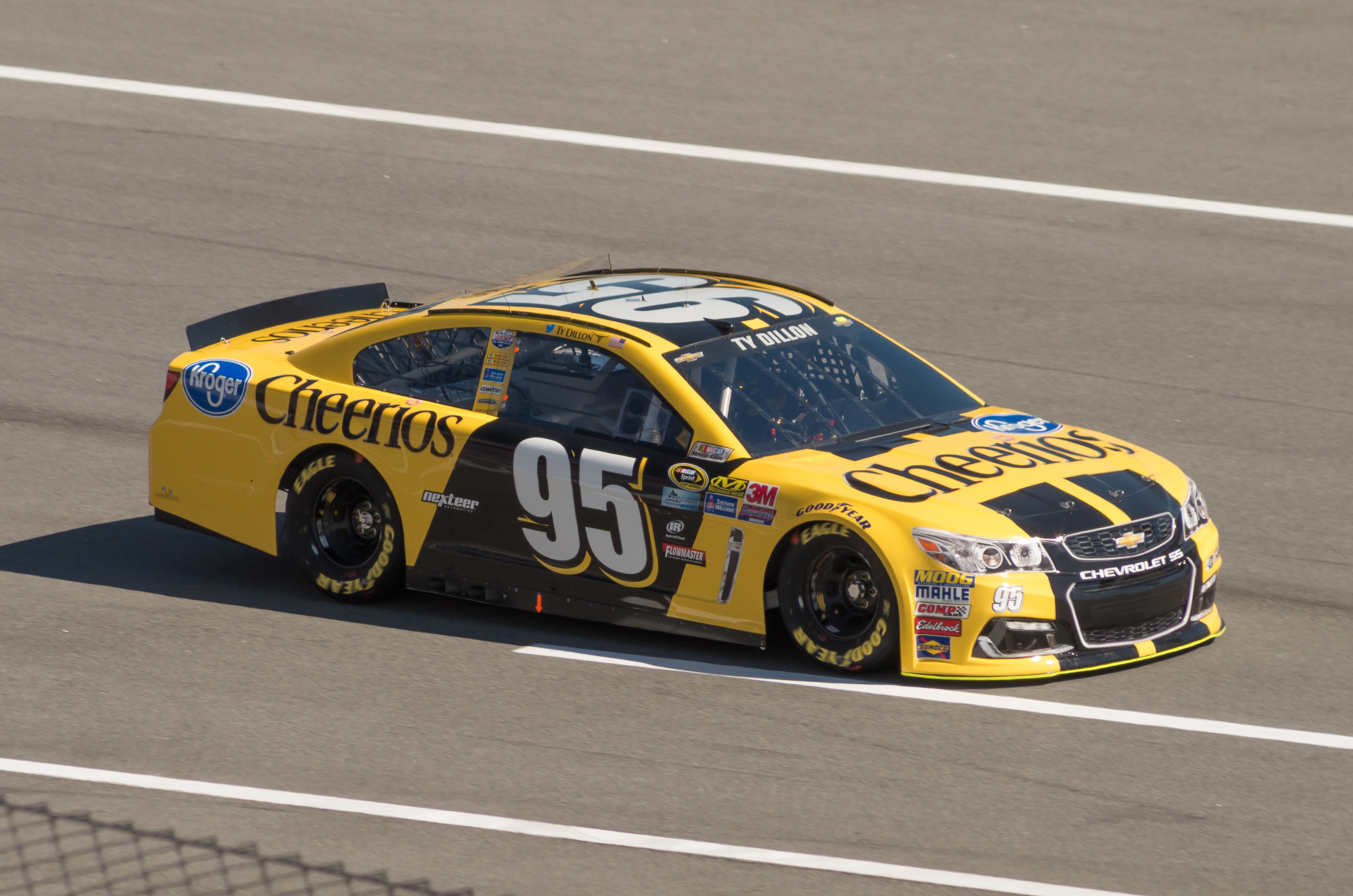
Dillon's 2016 Cup car for Leavine Family Racing

In 2016, Dillon joined Circle Sport – Leavine Family Racing, splitting the No. 95 with Michael McDowell with sponsorships from Cheerios and Nexteer, among others. Like the 33, the 95 had an alliance with RCR. Dillon also ran the No. 14 for Stewart–Haas Racing, substituting for an injured Tony Stewart. Dillon would finish seventh at Talladega for the running of the GEICO 500, but the credit would go to Stewart since he started the race. At Pocono, Dillon would lead his first three laps in Sprint Cup competition. Dillon took over for Regan Smith in the No. 7 Tommy Baldwin Racing Chevy at the Teenage Mutant Ninja Turtles 400 as Smith flew back to North Carolina to await the birth of his child.

On November 28, 2016, it was announced that Dillon would replace veteran Casey Mears, who has been with Germain for six years, in the No. 13 GEICO Chevrolet for Germain Racing in 2017. Along with GEICO, Twisted Tea was a primary sponsor of Germain Racing for a few races in 2017.

Germain Racing (2017–2020)

Dillon began the 2017 season with a crash in the Daytona 500. In the next race at Atlanta, he scored a 15th-place outing. The next week at Las Vegas, he finished in 21st place. He followed this up with a 16th-place finish at Phoenix, a 22nd-place finish at Martinsville, and then a 17th-place finish at Texas. He followed this finish with a fifteenth-place finish at Bristol and then a 26th-place finish at Richmond. At Talladega, Dillon finished a career-best thirteenth after avoiding the "Big One". He followed this finish with a fourteenth-place outing at Kansas. This was followed by a 36th-place finish at Charlotte. Dillon led 27 laps at Dover and was running with the leaders, but wrecked in overtime and finished fourteenth. At Daytona, Dillon had the lead with three to go but faded to sixteenth on the final restart. At Kentucky, Dillon finished 33rd.

In the second part of 2017, Dillon managed to score eight top-20 finishes, including two then-career-best finishes of 11th. He finished 24th in the final points standings.

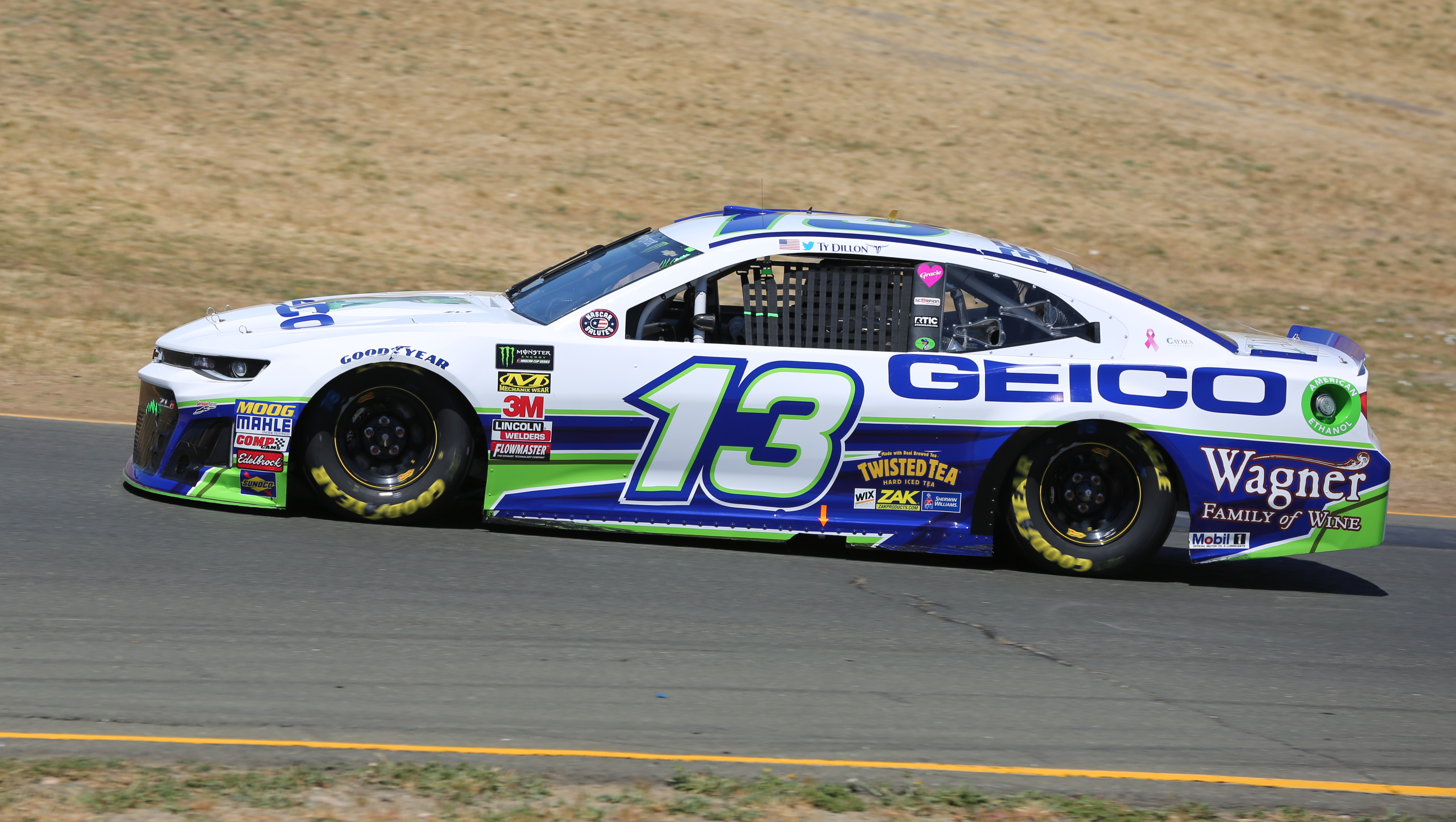
Dillon's No. 13 during the 2018 Toyota/Save Mart 350

After a rough first half of 2018, Dillon managed to avoid several 'big ones' to finish a then career-best sixth place in the Coke Zero Sugar 400 at Daytona. This was Dillon's first career top-ten finish in the Cup Series in 71 starts.

To start the 2019 season, Dillon managed to score another sixth-place finish, reminiscent of his previous Daytona top-ten. Once again, he avoided multiple large wrecks to get sixth place. Dillon managed to run as high as fifth place in overtime. At Bristol, Dillon won his first stage ever after holding off Clint Bowyer in a two-lap shootout after a restart in stage 1, finishing the race in 15th. In the GEICO 500, Dillon won his second stage in his career, winning the first stage. Dillon also scored his first-ever top-five finish and highest finish in his cup career at the rain-shortened July Daytona race, with a fourth place. Along with Joey Logano, Dillon was running at the checkered flag at every single race run during the season. Like in 2017, he finished 24th in points.

Dillon's 2020 season started with a DNF at that year's Daytona 500, finishing 30th. The next week at Las Vegas, Dillon finished tenth, his first top-ten at a non-plate track. For The Real Heroes 400 at Darlington, he'd start 33rd, determined after a random draw, and finish 19th. The starting positions for the upcoming Toyota 500 would be determined by inverting the top-twenty finishers of The Real Heroes 400, giving Dillon a spot on the front row starting second, alongside Ryan Preece. At the YellaWood 500 at Talladega on October 4, 2020, Dillon originally crossed the line and tied his best finish of fourth, but when Matt DiBenedetto was penalized for forcing someone below the yellow line, Dillon was promoted to third and that would be a new career-best finish for him. In Germain Racing's final season, Dillon finished 26th in the points standings.

On September 22, 2020, it was announced that Germain Racing would shut down after the 2020 season due to lack of sponsorship from Geico, and would sell their charter that guarantees the car would drive in every race in a season to the newly-formed 23XI Racing, led by Michael Jordan and Cup driver Denny Hamlin.

Gaunt Brothers Racing (2021)

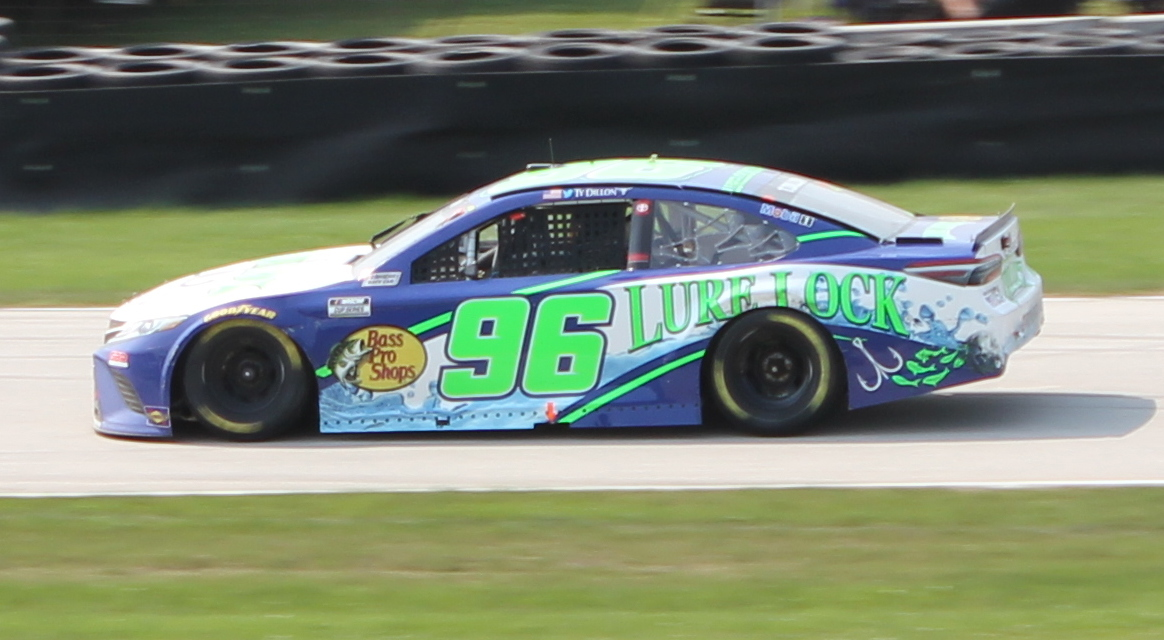
Dillon’s No. 96 car at Road America in 2021

After speculation for the previous few days, on January 19, 2021, it was announced that Dillon would attempt the 2021 Daytona 500 for Gaunt Brothers Racing driving the No. 96 Toyota with sponsorship from Bass Pro Shops and Black Rifle Coffee. This will be the first time that Dillon has not driven a Chevrolet in NASCAR and ARCA and gone outside of RCR and teams affiliated with RCR for a permanent ride in NASCAR. Before the 500, Dillon joined 23XI Racing for the Busch Clash in the No. 23 Toyota; he was eligible for the race due to winning a stage in the 2020 season, while regular driver Bubba Wallace was not. Despite finishing sixth in the first Duel of the 2021 Bluegreen Vacations Duels, Dillon missed the 2021 Daytona 500.

Petty GMS Motorsports (2022)

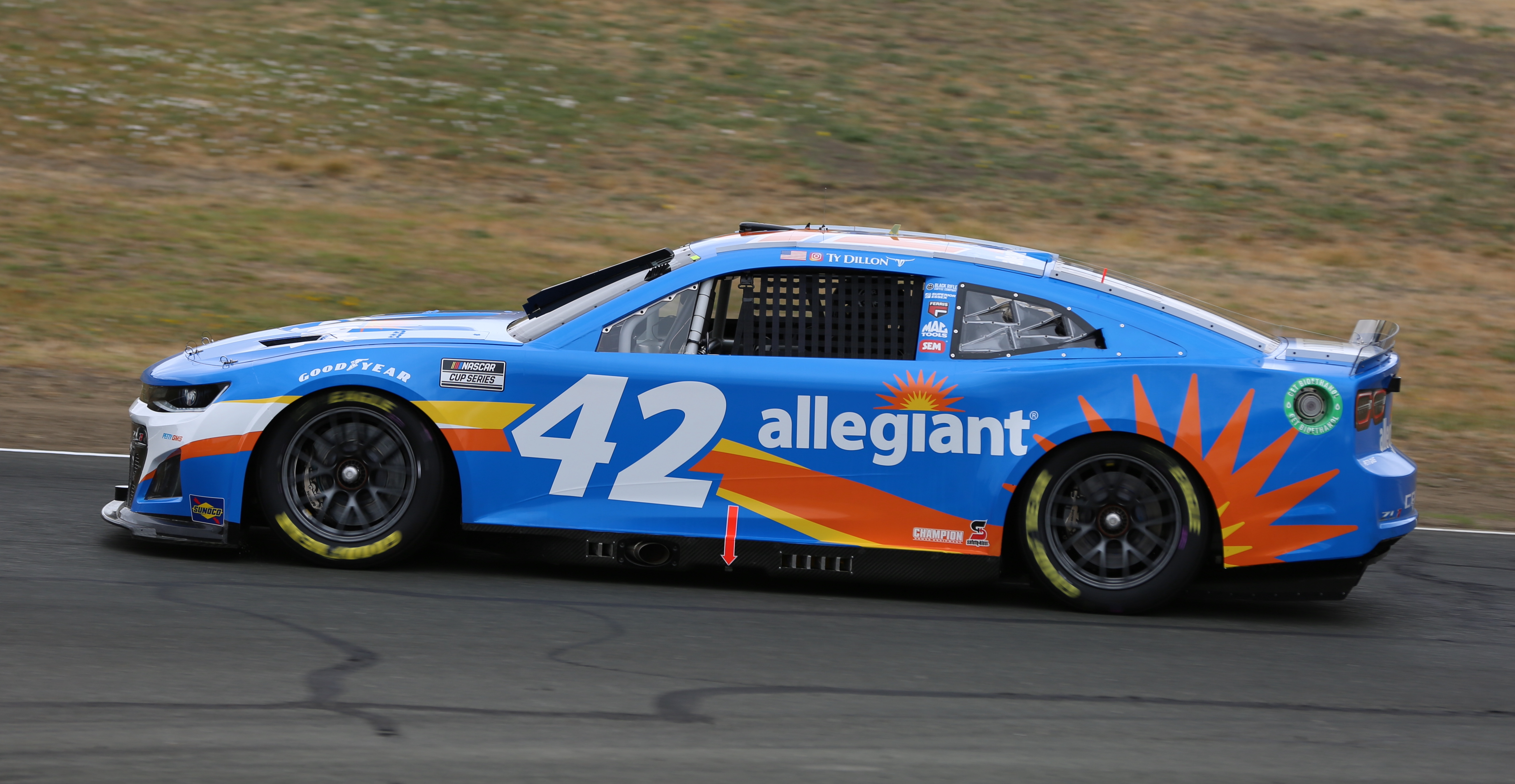
Dillon’s No. 42 car at Sonoma Raceway in 2022

On October 10, 2021, GMS Racing announced that Dillon would drive the No. 94 Chevrolet in their inaugural Cup season in 2022. On December 7, 2021, it was announced that Dillon's 2022 car number would change to the No. 42 alongside the No. 43 of Erik Jones as a teammate after GMS had purchased the majority interest of Richard Petty Motorsports. On July 16, 2022, Dillon confirmed that he would not return to the team in 2023. Prior to the Pocono race, the No. 42 was docked 35 driver and owner points for an L1 penalty when the pre-race inspection revealed issues on the car's rocker box vent hole. Dillon ended the season 29th in the points standings.

Spire Motorsports (2023)

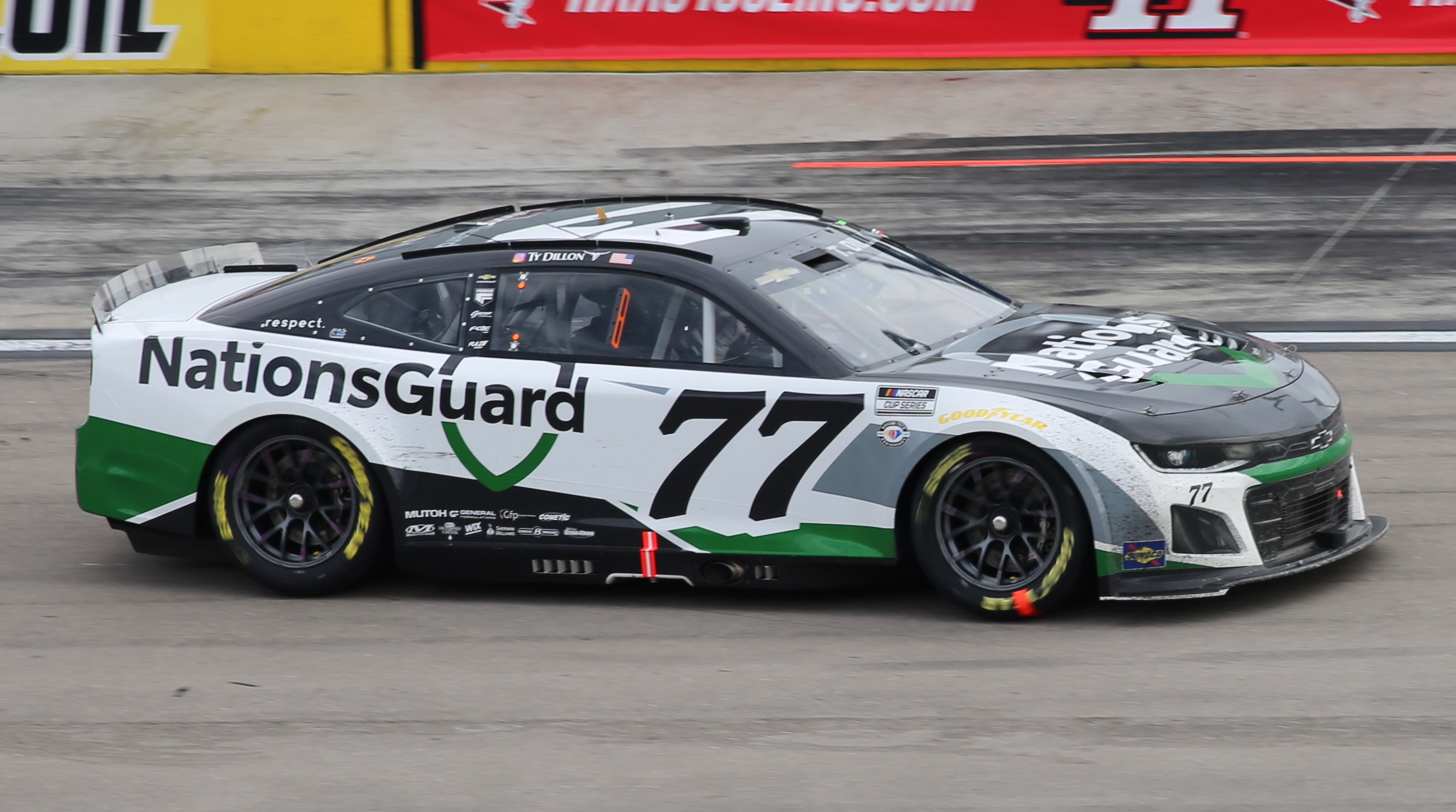
Dillon’s No. 77 car at Las Vegas Motor Speedway in 2023

On October 18, 2022, Spire Motorsports announced that Dillon would drive the No. 77 full-time in 2023. He began the season with a 40th-place DNF at the 2023 Daytona 500. Dillon struggled throughout the season, failing to score a top-ten finish and only ending up in the top-twenty on five occasions. He finished 32nd in the standings, last among all full-time drivers. On July 25, 2023, crew chief Kevin Bellicourt was replaced by Kevin Manion starting at the Richmond summer race. On October 10, 2023, Spire announced that Dillon would be replaced by Carson Hocevar for the 2024 season.

Multiple teams (2024)

On March 25, 2024, Kaulig Racing announced that Dillon would drive the No. 16 in a five-race deal, starting with the Richmond spring race. On May 21, it was announced that Dillon would drive the No. 50 Camaro for the newly rebranded Team AmeriVet at the Coca-Cola 600. On July 15, it was announced that Dillon would drive for Richard Childress Racing in the No. 33 for the first time since 2015 at the Brickyard 400 in Indianapolis. Dillon would start 22nd and finish 19th.

Kaulig Racing (2025–present)

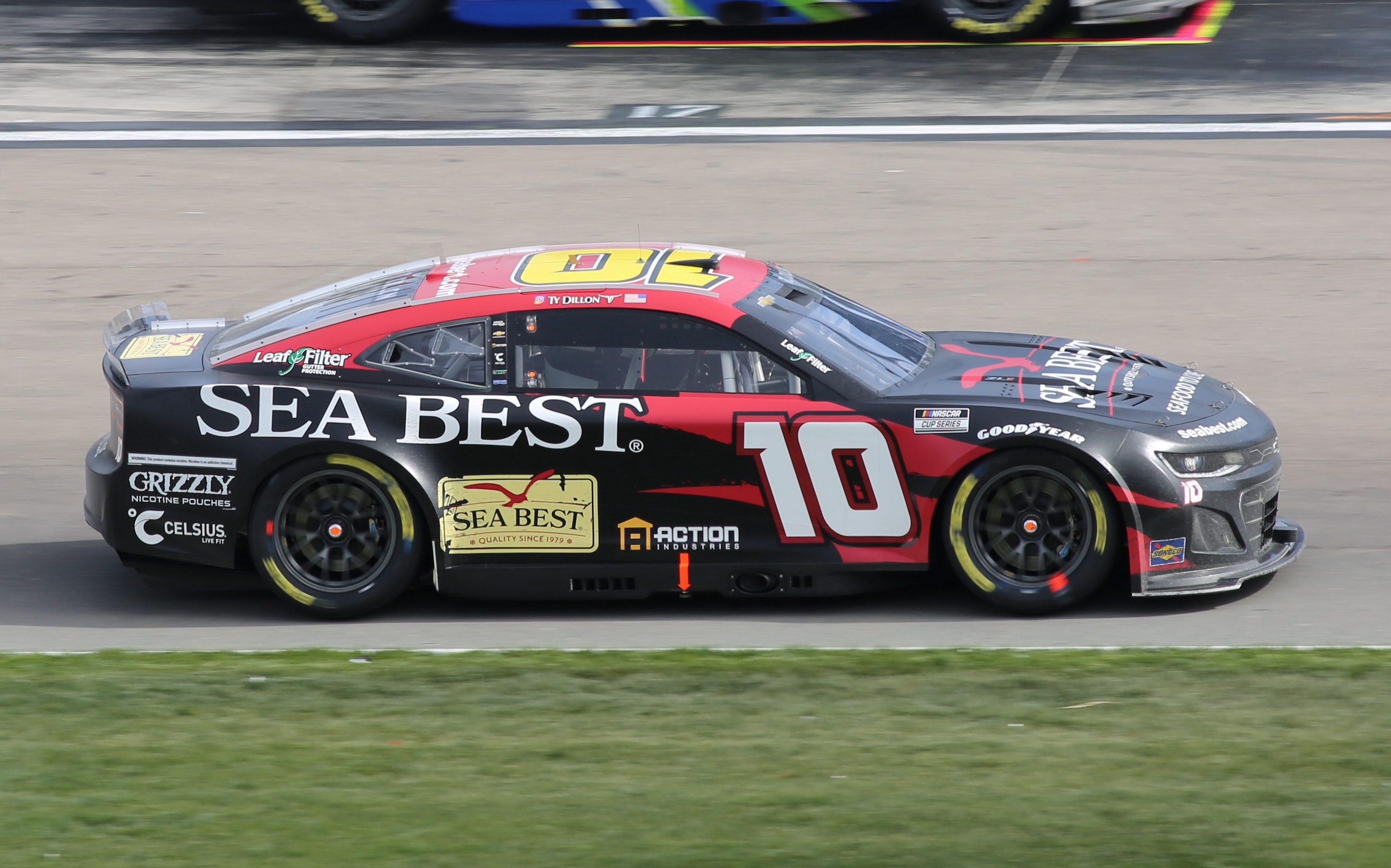
Dillon's No. 10 car at Las Vegas Motor Speedway in 2025

Dillon would return to the Cup Series full-time in 2025. He would drive the renumbered No. 10, replacing Daniel Hemric.

=== Other racing ===
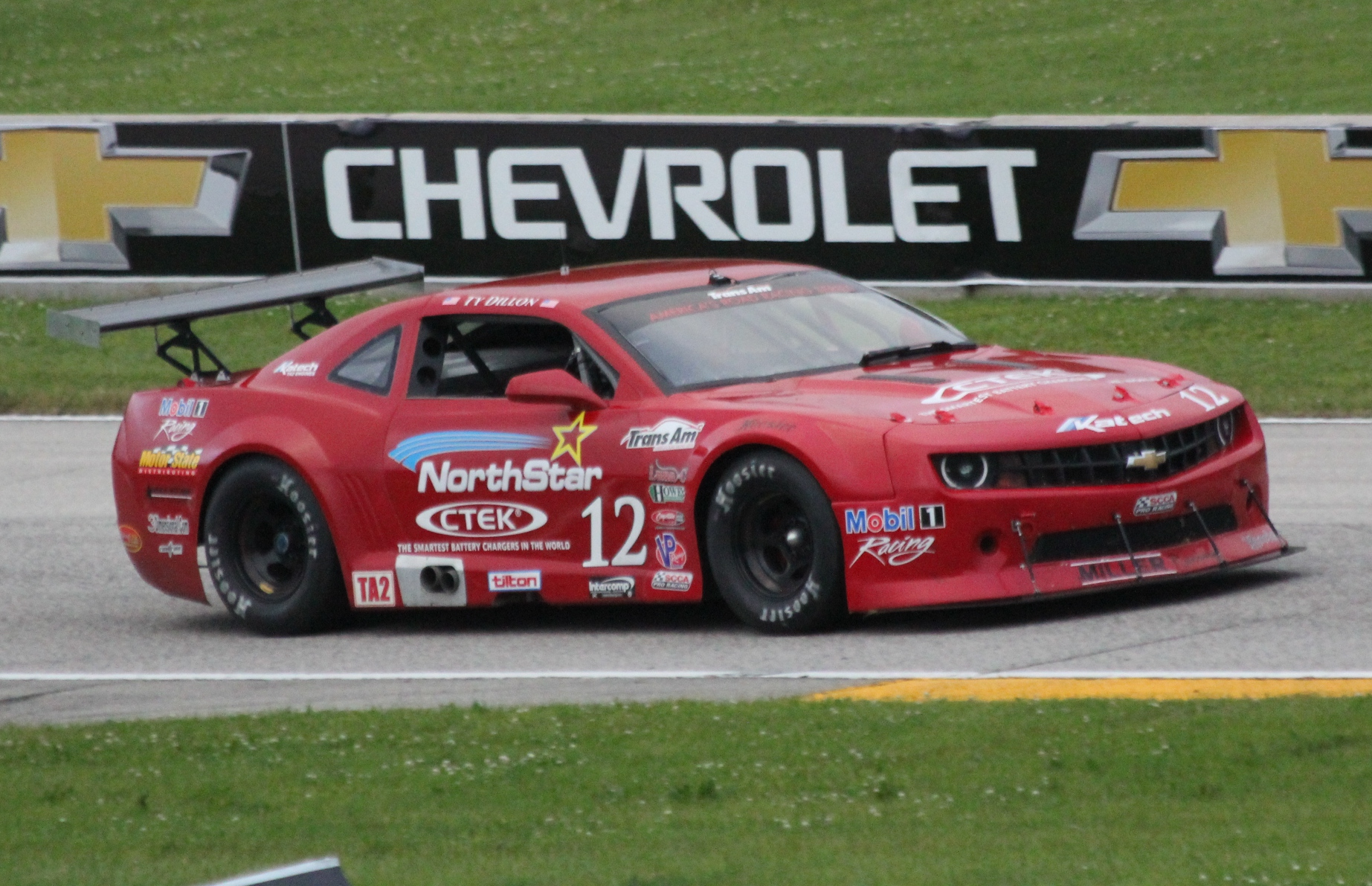
Dillon in the 2014 Trans-Am race at Road America

On June 16, 2014, Dillon announced he would make his Trans-Am Series debut at Road America for Miller Racing in the No. 12 TA2 Chevy Camaro. After starting sixth, Dillon finished fourth.

== Personal life ==
Dillon grew up in the Piedmont Triad of North Carolina with his parents, Mike Dillon (who is a retired NASCAR driver and current RCR team executive) and Tina Dillon, and his brother Austin, who also drives in the Cup Series.

Dillon's grandfather is Richard Childress, a North Carolina businessman and former professional stock car racing driver who owns NASCAR team Richard Childress Racing.

On December 28, 2013, Dillon announced his engagement to his girlfriend Haley Carey, a former driver herself and Charlotte Hornets cheerleader. They were married by Dillon's good friend Ray Wright on December 20, 2014, at Childress Vineyards in Lexington, North Carolina. On November 20, 2017, the two welcomed a daughter, Oakley Ray Dillon. Their son Kapton Reed Dillon was born on October 29, 2020.

On May 26, 2017, Fin & Field named Dillon the Most Interesting Sportsman in the World for the Spring of 2017.

Dillon did regular vlogs on his YouTube channel following his personal and racing life in a series called The Ride.

Dillon formerly co-owned sports management agency Team Dillon Management with his brother Austin, who currently manages both themselves, John Hunter Nemechek, A. J. Allmendinger, Anthony Alfredo, Tanner Thorson, Kaulig Racing, Brian Gay, and Chris Stroud. On December 5, 2019, Dillon announced he would leave TDM and join fellow competitor Kevin Harvick's KHI Management Agency.

In 2019, Dillon made a cameo in the movie Stuber.

== Motorsports career results ==
=== Racing career summary ===
Season	Series	Team	Races	Wins	Top 5	Top 10	Points	Position
2009	NASCAR Camping World East Series	Richard Childress Racing	3	0	0	2	400	29th
2010	NASCAR K&N Pro Series East	Richard Childress Racing	8	1	2	4	1089	13th
2010	NASCAR K&N Pro Series West	Richard Childress Racing	1	0	1	1	165	55th
2010	ARCA Racing Series	Richard Childress Racing	3	2	3	3	700	38th
2011	NASCAR K&N Pro Series West	Richard Childress Racing	1	0	1	1	165	68th
2011	ARCA Racing Series	Richard Childress Racing	19	7	13	16	5220	**1st**
2011	NASCAR Camping World Truck Series	Kevin Harvick Inc.	3	0	1	2	105	39th
2012	NASCAR Camping World Truck Series	Richard Childress Racing	22	1	7	17	784	4th
2012	NASCAR Nationwide Series	Richard Childress Racing	3	0	1	3	0	NC†
2013	NASCAR Camping World Truck Series	Richard Childress Racing	22	2	9	12	764	**2nd**
2013	NASCAR Nationwide Series	Richard Childress Racing	9	0	0	1	0	NC†
2013	NASCAR Canadian Tire Series	Fitzpatrick Motorsports	2	0	0	1	49	42nd
2014	NASCAR Camping World Truck Series	NTS Motorsports	1	0	0	1	0	NC†
2014	NASCAR Camping World Truck Series	Richard Childress Racing	1	0	1	1	0	NC†
2014	NASCAR Nationwide Series	Richard Childress Racing	33	1	7	24	1148	5th
2014	NASCAR Sprint Cup Series	Richard Childress Racing	2	0	0	0	0	NC†
2015	NASCAR Camping World Truck Series	NTS Motorsports	1	0	0	0	0	NC†
2015	NASCAR Camping World Truck Series	GMS Racing	3	0	1	2	0	NC†
2015	NASCAR Xfinity Series	Richard Childress Racing	33	0	12	25	1172	**3rd**
2015	NASCAR Sprint Cup Series	Richard Childress Racing	5	0	0	0	0	NC†
2016	NASCAR Xfinity Series	Richard Childress Racing	33	0	9	17	2214	5th
2016	NASCAR Sprint Cup Series	Circle Sport - Leavine Family Racing	7	0	0	0	0	NC†
2016	NASCAR Sprint Cup Series	Stewart-Haas Racing	3	0	0	0	0	NC†
2016	NASCAR Sprint Cup Series	Tommy Baldwin Racing	1	0	0	0	0	NC†
2017	NASCAR Camping World Truck Series	MDM Motorsports	2	0	1	1	0	NC†
2017	NASCAR Camping World Truck Series	NEMCO Motorsports	1	0	0	0	0	NC†
2017	NASCAR Xfinity Series	Richard Childress Racing	27	0	3	16	0	NC†
2017	Monster Energy NASCAR Cup Series	Germain Racing	36	0	0	0	593	24th
2018	NASCAR Camping World Truck Series	Young's Motorsports	1	0	0	0	0	NC†
2018	NASCAR Xfinity Series	Richard Childress Racing	8	0	1	2	0	NC†
2018	Monster Energy NASCAR Cup Series	Germain Racing	36	0	0	1	482	27th
2019	Monster Energy NASCAR Cup Series	Germain Racing	36	0	1	3	613	24th
2020	NASCAR Cup Series	Germain Racing	36	0	1	2	556	26th
2021	NASCAR Camping World Truck Series	Bret Holmes Racing	1	0	0	0	12	77th
2021	NASCAR Xfinity Series	Joe Gibbs Racing	4	0	0	0	0	NC†
2021	NASCAR Xfinity Series	Our Motorsports	6	0	1	2	0	NC†
2021	NASCAR Xfinity Series	Jordan Anderson Racing	1	0	0	1	0	NC†
2021	NASCAR Cup Series	Gaunt Brothers Racing	4	0	0	0	0	NC†
2022	NASCAR Xfinity Series	JD Motorsports	2	0	0	0	0	NC†
2022	NASCAR Xfinity Series	Our Motorsports	1	0	0	0	0	NC†
2022	NASCAR Xfinity Series	Big Machine Racing	1	0	0	1	0	NC†
2022	NASCAR Cup Series	Petty GMS Motorsports	36	0	0	1	518	29th
2023	NASCAR Xfinity Series	Richard Childress Racing	2	0	0	0	9	NC†
2023	NASCAR Xfinity Series	JD Motorsports	1	0	0	0	9	NC†
2023	NASCAR Cup Series	Spire Motorsports	36	0	0	0	364	32nd
2024	NASCAR Craftsman Truck Series	Rackley W.A.R.	18	0	0	2	334	22nd
2024	NASCAR Xfinity Series	JD Motorsports	1	0	0	0	0	NC†
2024	NASCAR Cup Series	Kaulig Racing	5	0	0	0	0	NC†
2024	NASCAR Cup Series	Team AmeriVet	1	0	0	0	0	NC†
2024	NASCAR Cup Series	Richard Childress Racing	1	0	0	0	0	NC†
2025	NASCAR Cup Series	Kaulig Racing	36	0	0	1	477	33rd
2026	NASCAR Craftsman Truck Series	Kaulig Racing					0	NC†
2026	NASCAR Cup Series	Kaulig Racing					TBD	TBD

^{†} As Dillon was a guest driver, he was ineligible for championship points.

=== NASCAR ===
(key) (Bold – Pole position awarded by qualifying time. Italics – Pole position earned by points standings or practice time. * – Most laps led.)

==== Cup Series ====
NASCAR Cup Series results
Year	Team	No.	Make	1	2	3	4	5	6	7	8	9	10	11	12	13	14	15	16	17	18	19	20	21	22	23	24	25	26	27	28	29	30	31	32	33	34	35	36	NCSC	Pts	Ref
2014	Richard Childress Racing	33	Chevy	DAY	PHO	LVS	BRI	CAL	MAR	TEX	DAR	RCH	TAL	KAN	CLT	DOV	POC	MCH	SON	KEN	DAY	NHA	IND	POC	GLN	MCH	BRI	ATL; 25	RCH	CHI	NHA	DOV	KAN	CLT	TAL	MAR	TEX	PHO; 27	HOM	60th	0^{1}	
2015	Richard Childress Racing	33	Chevy	DAY; 28	ATL	LVS	PHO	CAL	MAR	TEX	BRI	RCH	TAL	KAN; 26	CLT	DOV	POC; 18	MCH; 14	SON	DAY	KEN	NHA	IND	POC	GLN	MCH	BRI	DAR	RCH	CHI	NHA	DOV	CLT	KAN	TAL	MAR	TEX	PHO	HOM; 23	56th	0^{1}	
2016	Circle Sport – Leavine Family Racing	95	Chevy	DAY; 25						TEX; 20							POC; 21	MCH; 24	SON	DAY	KEN; 25	NHA	IND	POC	GLN	BRI	MCH	DAR	RCH			DOV; 32	CLT	KAN	TAL	MAR	TEX	PHO	HOM; 33	53rd	0^{1}	
2016	Stewart–Haas Racing	14	Chevy		ATL; 17	LVS	PHO; 15	CAL	MAR		BRI; 25	RCH	TAL; QL^{†}	KAN	DOV	CLT																								53rd	0^{1}	
2016	Tommy Baldwin Racing	7	Chevy																											CHI; 27	NHA									53rd	0^{1}	
2017	Germain Racing	13	Chevy	DAY; 30	ATL; 15	LVS; 21	PHO; 16	CAL; 18	MAR; 22	TEX; 17	BRI; 15	RCH; 26	TAL; 13	KAN; 14	CLT; 36	DOV; 14	POC; 18	MCH; 20	SON; 28	DAY; 16	KEN; 33	NHA; 16	IND; 19	POC; 17	GLN; 19	MCH; 21	BRI; 36	DAR; 13	RCH; 22	CHI; 28	NHA; 22	DOV; 22	CLT; 21	TAL; 11	KAN; 16	MAR; 30	TEX; 24	PHO; 11	HOM; 26	24th	593	
2018	Germain Racing	13	Chevy	DAY; 39	ATL; 26	LVS; 24	PHO; 30	CAL; 27	MAR; 22	TEX; 13	BRI; 28	RCH; 20	TAL; 15	DOV; 24	KAN; 38	CLT; 21	POC; 23	MCH; 21	SON; 33	CHI; 28	DAY; 6	KEN; 29	NHA; 23	POC; 24	GLN; 23	MCH; 38	BRI; 21	DAR; 21	IND; 21	LVS; 34	RCH; 28	ROV; 22	DOV; 29	TAL; 15	KAN; 25	MAR; 15	TEX; 22	PHO; 19	HOM; 22	27th	482	
2019	Germain Racing	13	Chevy	DAY; 6	ATL; 25	LVS; 29	PHO; 15	CAL; 27	MAR; 13	TEX; 21	BRI; 15	RCH; 21	TAL; 17	DOV; 22	KAN; 28	CLT; 23	POC; 27	MCH; 22	SON; 27	CHI; 35	DAY; 4	KEN; 26	NHA; 16	POC; 29	GLN; 30	MCH; 11	BRI; 20	DAR; 20	IND; 13	LVS; 16	RCH; 26	ROV; 15	DOV; 23	TAL; 10	KAN; 22	MAR; 24	TEX; 18	PHO; 20	HOM; 24	24th	613	
2020	Germain Racing	13	Chevy	DAY; 30	LVS; 10	CAL; 26	PHO; 15	DAR; 19	DAR; 19	CLT; 25	CLT; 27	BRI; 39	ATL; 29	MAR; 22	HOM; 28	TAL; 12	POC; 26	POC; 23	IND; 14	KEN; 16	TEX; 35	KAN; 15	NHA; 22	MCH; 23	MCH; 18	DRC; 20	DOV; 18	DOV; 29	DAY; 22	DAR; 27	RCH; 28	BRI; 18	LVS; 26	TAL; 3	ROV; 23	KAN; 24	TEX; 24	MAR; 16	PHO; 21	26th	556	
2021	Gaunt Brothers Racing	96	Toyota	DAY; DNQ	DRC; 19	HOM	LVS	PHO	ATL	BRD; 26	MAR	RCH	TAL	KAN	DAR	DOV	COA; 21	CLT	SON	NSH	POC	POC	ROA; 26	ATL	NHA	GLN	IRC	MCH	DAY	DAR	RCH	BRI	LVS	TAL	ROV	TEX	KAN	MAR	PHO	49th	0^{1}	
2022	Petty GMS Motorsports	42	Chevy	DAY; 11	CAL; 17	LVS; 20	PHO; 15	ATL; 36	COA; 20	RCH; 24	MAR; 23	BRD; 10	TAL; 33	DOV; 27	DAR; 12	KAN; 20	CLT; 13	GTW; 27	SON; 23	NSH; 31	ROA; 20	ATL; 28	NHA; 33	POC; 22	IRC; 34	MCH; 14	RCH; 17	GLN; 16	DAY; 18	DAR; 22	KAN; 20	BRI; 26	TEX; 16	TAL; 23	ROV; 25	LVS; 33	HOM; 26	MAR; 31	PHO; 26	29th	518	
2023	Spire Motorsports	77	Chevy	DAY; 40	CAL; 31	LVS; 34	PHO; 30	ATL; 23	COA; 39	RCH; 32	BRD; 21	MAR; 32	TAL; 14	DOV; 36	KAN; 22	DAR; 27	CLT; 27	GTW; 25	SON; 23	NSH; 32	CSC; 35	ATL; 19	NHA; 26	POC; 28	RCH; 34	MCH; 20	IRC; 27	GLN; 34	DAY; 11	DAR; 29	KAN; 28	BRI; 33	TEX; 19	TAL; 27	ROV; 31	LVS; 24	HOM; 24	MAR; 24	PHO; 28	32nd	364	
2024	Kaulig Racing	16	Chevy	DAY	ATL	LVS	PHO	BRI	COA	RCH; 29	MAR	TEX; 16	TAL	DOV	KAN	DAR					NHA; 20	NSH	CSC	POC		RCH; 26	MCH	DAY	DAR	ATL	GLN	BRI	KAN; 21	TAL	ROV	LVS	HOM	MAR	PHO	50th	0^{1}	
2024	Team AmeriVet	50	Chevy														CLT; 36	GTW	SON	IOW																				50th	0^{1}	
2024	Richard Childress Racing	33	Chevy																						IND; 19															50th	0^{1}	
2025	Kaulig Racing	10	Chevy	DAY; 14	ATL; 29	COA; 28	PHO; 16	LVS; 21	HOM; 27	MAR; 15	DAR; 16	BRI; 32	TAL; 23	TEX; 12	KAN; 35	CLT; 19	NSH; 26	MCH; 24	MXC; 33	POC; 33	ATL; 8	CSC; 20	SON; 17	DOV; 20	IND; 28	IOW; 35	GLN; 30	RCH; 20	DAY; 22	DAR; 34	GTW; 34	BRI; 27	NHA; 29	KAN; 13	ROV; 27	LVS; 37	TAL; 20	MAR; 26	PHO; 35	33rd	477	
2026	Kaulig Racing	10	Chevy	DAY; 14	ATL; 16	COA; 16	PHO; 26	LVS; 33	DAR; 31	MAR; 37	BRI; 29	KAN; 33	TAL; 13	TEX; 24	GLN; 33	CLT; 25	NSH; 12	MCH; 24	POC; 32	COR; 30	SON; 35	CHI; 20	ATL; 20	NWS; 16	IND; 30	IOW; 24	RCH; 32	NHA; 27	DAY; 21	DAR; 31	GTW; 30	BRI; 36	KAN; 28	LVS; 31	CLT; 30	PHO; 31	TAL; 15	MAR; 22	HOM; 31	34th	395	
^{†} – Qualified for Tony Stewart and also relieved him in the race

===== Daytona 500 =====
Year	Team	Manufacturer	Start	Finish
2015	Richard Childress Racing	Chevrolet	31	28
2016	Circle Sport – Leavine Family Racing	Chevrolet	12	25
2017	Germain Racing	Chevrolet	18	30
2018	Germain Racing	Chevrolet	23	39
2019	Germain Racing	Chevrolet	22	6
2020	Germain Racing	Chevrolet	24	30
2021	Gaunt Brothers Racing	Toyota	DNQ	
2022	Petty GMS Motorsports	Chevrolet	26	11
2023	Spire Motorsports	Chevrolet	37	40
2025	Kaulig Racing	Chevrolet	7	14
2026	Kaulig Racing	Chevrolet	34	14

==== Xfinity Series ====
NASCAR Xfinity Series results
Year	Team	No.	Make	1	2	3	4	5	6	7	8	9	10	11	12	13	14	15	16	17	18	19	20	21	22	23	24	25	26	27	28	29	30	31	32	33	NXSC	Pts	Ref
2012	Richard Childress Racing	33	Chevy	DAY	PHO	LVS	BRI	CAL	TEX	RCH	TAL	DAR	IOW	CLT	DOV; 7	MCH	ROA	KEN	DAY	NHA	CHI																117th	0^{1}	
2012	Richard Childress Racing	51	Chevy																			IND; 3	IOW	GLN	CGV	BRI	ATL	RCH; 7	CHI	KEN	DOV	CLT	KAN	TEX	PHO	HOM	117th	0^{1}	
2013	Richard Childress Racing	33	Chevy	DAY	PHO	LVS; 11	BRI	CAL	TEX	RCH	TAL; 24	DAR; 13	CLT	DOV; 23	IOW	MCH	ROA	KEN	DAY; 27	NHA	CHI	IND	IOW	GLN	MOH	BRI; 7	ATL	RCH; 16	CHI	KEN	DOV	KAN	CLT	TEX; 12	PHO	HOM; 14	105th	0^{1}	
2014	Richard Childress Racing	3	Chevy	DAY; 7	PHO; 10	**LVS**; 11	BRI; 6	CAL; 8	TEX; 9	DAR; 10	RCH; 14	TAL; 15	IOW; 8	CLT; 10	DOV; 8	MCH; 9	ROA; 19	KEN; 7	DAY; 11	NHA; 12	CHI; 5	IND; 1	IOW; 5	GLN; 8	MOH; 19	BRI; 4	ATL; 9	RCH; 9	CHI; 7	**KEN**; 3*	DOV; 10	**KAN**; 5	CLT; 30	TEX; 15	PHO; 4	HOM; 7	5th	1148	
2015	Richard Childress Racing	3	Chevy	DAY; 3	ATL; 3	LVS; 8	PHO; 6	CAL; 14	TEX; 12	BRI; 5	RCH; 9	TAL; 8	IOW; 14	CLT; 7	DOV; 8	MCH; 13	CHI; 9	DAY; 26	KEN; 15	NHA; 6	IND; 9	IOW; 4	GLN; 5	MOH; 3	BRI; 4	ROA; 10	DAR; 15	RCH; 8	CHI; 5	KEN; 2	DOV; 28	CLT; 6	KAN; 4	TEX; 5	PHO; 5	HOM; 7	3rd	1172	
2016	Richard Childress Racing	3	Chevy	**DAY**; 13	ATL; 5	LVS; 7	PHO; 6	CAL; 17	TEX; 13	BRI; 7	RCH; 2	TAL; 19	DOV; 5	CLT; 8	POC; 3	MCH; 15	IOW; 2	DAY; 14	KEN; 7	NHA; 34	IND; 9	IOW; 2	GLN; 11	MOH; 4	BRI; 25	ROA; 12	DAR; 12	RCH; 6	CHI; 11	KEN; 27	DOV; 2	CLT; 11	KAN; 12	TEX; 16	PHO; 7	HOM; 2	5th	2214	
2017	Richard Childress Racing	3	Chevy	DAY; 19	ATL; 17	LVS; 24	PHO; 10	CAL; 10	TEX; 8	BRI; 6	RCH; 19	TAL; 14	CLT; 18	DOV; 10	POC; 8	MCH; 6	IOW	DAY; 21	KEN; 5	NHA; 8	IND; 10	IOW	GLN; 7	MOH	BRI; 4	ROA	DAR; 7	RCH; 3	CHI; 8	KEN	DOV; 13	CLT; 15	KAN; 9	TEX; 16	PHO; 13	HOM	99th	0^{1}	
2018	Richard Childress Racing	3	Chevy	DAY	ATL; 13	LVS	PHO; 13	CAL	TEX; 12	BRI	RCH	TAL	DOV	CLT; 4	POC	MCH	IOW	CHI	DAY	KEN; 14	NHA	IOW	GLN	MOH	BRI; 15	ROA	DAR; 9	IND; 33	LVS	RCH	ROV	DOV	KAN	TEX	PHO	HOM	94th	0^{1}	
2021	Joe Gibbs Racing	54	Toyota	DAY; 14	DRC	HOM; 37	LVS; 31	PHO	ATL	MAR	TAL; 35	DAR	DOV	COA																							79th	0^{1}	
2021	Our Motorsports	23	Chevy												CLT; 7	MOH	TEX	NSH	POC	ROA	ATL; 5	NHA	GLN	IRC	MCH	DAY			BRI; 15			ROV; 26	TEX	KAN	MAR	PHO	79th	0^{1}	
2021	Our Motorsports	02	Chevy																								DAR; 13	RCH; 11									79th	0^{1}	
2021	Jordan Anderson Racing	31	Chevy																											LVS; 8	TAL						79th	0^{1}	
2022	JD Motorsports	6	Chevy	DAY	CAL	LVS	PHO	ATL	COA	RCH	MAR	TAL	DOV	DAR	TEX	CLT	PIR	NSH	ROA; 37	ATL			IRC; 20	MCH	GLN	DAY											86th	0^{1}	
2022	Big Machine Racing	48	Chevy																		NHA; 6	POC															86th	0^{1}	
2022	Our Motorsports	02	Chevy																								DAR; 35	KAN	BRI	TEX	TAL	ROV	LVS	HOM	MAR	PHO	86th	0^{1}	
2023	Richard Childress Racing	3	Chevy	DAY	CAL	LVS	PHO	ATL	COA	RCH	MAR	TAL	DOV	DAR; 19	CLT	PIR						POC; 14	ROA	MCH	IRC	GLN	DAY	DAR	KAN	BRI	TEX	ROV	LVS	HOM	MAR	PHO	93rd	0^{1}	
2023	JD Motorsports	4	Chevy														SON; 23	NSH	CSC	ATL	NHA																93rd	0^{1}	
2024	JD Motorsports	6	Chevy	DAY	ATL	LVS	PHO	COA; 37	RCH	MAR	TEX	TAL	DOV	DAR	CLT	PIR	SON	IOW	NHA	NSH																	109th	0^{1}	
2024	JD Motorsports	4	Chevy																		CSC; DNQ	POC	IND	MCH	DAY	DAR	ATL	GLN	BRI	KAN	TAL	ROV	LVS	HOM	MAR	PHO	109th	0^{1}	
2025	Kaulig Racing	11	Chevy	DAY	ATL	COA	PHO	LVS; RL^{†}	HOM; QL^{‡}	MAR	DAR	BRI	CAR	TAL	TEX	CLT	NSH	MXC	POC	ATL	CSC	SON	DOV	IND	IOW	GLN	DAY	PIR	GTW	BRI	KAN	ROV	LVS	TAL	MAR	PHO	N/A	—	
^{†} – Relieved Josh Williams ^{‡} – Qualified for Josh Williams

==== Craftsman Truck Series ====
NASCAR Craftsman Truck Series results
Year	Team	No.	Make	1	2	3	4	5	6	7	8	9	10	11	12	13	14	15	16	17	18	19	20	21	22	23	24	25	NCTC	Pts	Ref
2011	Kevin Harvick Inc.	21	Chevy	DAY	PHO	DAR	MAR	NSH	DOV	CLT	KAN	TEX	KEN; 18	IOW	NSH	IRP	POC	MCH	BRI	ATL	CHI	NHA	KEN	LVS	TAL	MAR	TEX; 3	HOM; 6	39th	105	
2012	Richard Childress Racing	3	Chevy	DAY; 9	MAR; 2	CAR; 8	KAN; 9	**CLT**; 10	DOV; 6	TEX; 7	KEN; 3	IOW; 7	CHI; 12	POC; 6	MCH; 6	BRI; 21	**ATL**; 1	IOW; 2	KEN; 3	LVS; 10	**TAL**; 4*	MAR; 28	TEX; 5	PHO; 15	HOM; 25				4th	784	
2013	Richard Childress Racing	3	Chevy	DAY; 6*	MAR; 18	CAR; 12	KAN; 8	CLT; 5	DOV; 31	TEX; 2*	KEN; 1	IOW; 16*	ELD; 16	POC; 20	MCH; 3	BRI; 6	MSP; 17*	IOW; 3	CHI; 5	**LVS**; 4	TAL; 14*	MAR; 22	TEX; 1*	PHO; 4	HOM; 14				2nd	764	
2014	Richard Childress Racing	3	Chevy	DAY	MAR	KAN	CLT	DOV	TEX	GTW	KEN	IOW	ELD; 5	POC	MCH	BRI	MSP	CHI	NHA	LVS	TAL	MAR	TEX	PHO					95th	0^{1}	
2014	NTS Motorsports	9	Chevy																						HOM; 7				95th	0^{1}	
2015	GMS Racing	33	Chevy	**DAY**; 11	ATL; 2	MAR	KAN	CLT	DOV	TEX	GTW	IOW	KEN	ELD; 10	POC	MCH													86th	0^{1}	
2015	NTS Motorsports	31	Chevy														BRI; 23	MSP	CHI	NHA	LVS	TAL	MAR	TEX	PHO	HOM			86th	0^{1}	
2017	MDM Motorsports	99	Chevy	DAY	ATL	MAR; 5	KAN	CLT	DOV	TEX	GTW	IOW	KEN	ELD; 12	POC	MCH	BRI	MSP	CHI	NHA	LVS	TAL							78th	0^{1}	
2017	NEMCO Motorsports	87	Chevy																				MAR; 15	TEX	PHO	HOM			78th	0^{1}	
2018	Young's Motorsports	12	Chevy	DAY	ATL	LVS	MAR	DOV	KAN	CLT	TEX	IOW	GTW	CHI	KEN	ELD; 11	POC	MCH	BRI	MSP	LVS	TAL	MAR	TEX	PHO	HOM			100th	0^{1}	
2021	Bret Holmes Racing	32	Chevy	DAY	DRC	LVS	ATL	BRD	RCH	KAN	DAR	COA	CLT	TEX	NSH	POC	KNX	GLN	GTW	DAR	BRI	LVS	TAL	MAR	PHO; 25				77th	12	
2024	Rackley W.A.R.	25	Chevy	DAY; 35	ATL; 14	LVS; 26	BRI; 20	COA; 11	MAR; 23	TEX; 23	KAN; 15	DAR; 9	NWS; 25	CLT; 24	GTW; 13	NSH; 15	POC; 25	IRP; 18	RCH; 9	MLW; 16	BRI; 30	KAN	TAL	HOM	MAR	PHO			22nd	334	
2026	Kaulig Racing	25	Ram	DAY	ATL; 11	STP	DAR	CAR; 22	BRI	TEX	GLN	DOV	CLT	NSH	MCH	COR	LRP	NWS	IRP	RCH	NHA	BRI	KAN	CLT	PHO	TAL	MAR	HOM	109th	0^{1}	

^{*} Season still in progress
^{1} Ineligible for series points

==== Canadian Tire Series ====
NASCAR Canadian Tire Series results
Year	Team	No.	Make	1	2	3	4	5	6	7	8	9	10	11	12	NCTC	Pts	Ref
2013	Fitzpatrick Motorsports	4	Chevy	MSP; 7	DEL	MSP	ICAR	MPS	SAS	ASE	CTR	RIS	MSP; 32	BAR	KWA	42nd	49	

=== ARCA Racing Series ===
(key) (Bold – Pole position awarded by qualifying time. Italics – Pole position earned by points standings or practice time. * – Most laps led.)

ARCA Racing Series results
Year	Team	No.	Make	1	2	3	4	5	6	7	8	9	10	11	12	13	14	15	16	17	18	19	20	ARSC	Pts	Ref
2010	Richard Childress Racing	41	Chevy	DAY	PBE	SLM	TEX	TAL	TOL	POC	MCH	**IOW**; 2	MFD	POC	BLN	NJE	ISF	CHI	DSF	TOL	SLM	KAN; 1	CAR; 1	38th	700	
2011	Richard Childress Racing	41	Chevy	**DAY**; 11	**TAL**; 1*	**SLM**; 2*	TOL; 1	NJE; 8	CHI; 1	POC; 4	MCH; 1	WIN; 4	BLN; 11	**IOW**; 1*	**IRP**; 1*	POC; 1*	**ISF**; 13	MAD; 4	**DSF**; 2	SLM; 8	KAN; 7*	TOL; 2*		1st	5220	

==== K&N Pro Series East ====
NASCAR K&N Pro Series East results
Year	Team	No.	Make	1	2	3	4	5	6	7	8	9	10	11	NKNPSEC	Pts	Ref
2009	Richard Childress Racing	3	Chevy	GRE	TRI	IOW	SBO; 8	GLN	NHA	TMP	ADI; 7	LRP	NHA; 17	DOV	29th	400	
2010	Richard Childress Racing	3	Chevy	GRE; 18	SBO; 10		MAR; 22	NHA; 6	LRP	LEE	JFC; 1	NHA; 12	DOV; 17		13th	1089	
2010	Richard Childress Racing	33	Chevy			IOW; 2									13th	1089	

==== K&N Pro Series West ====
NASCAR K&N Pro Series West results
Year	Team	No.	Make	1	2	3	4	5	6	7	8	9	10	11	12	13	14	NKNPSWC	Pts	Ref
2010	Richard Childress Racing with Jim Offenbach	31	Chevy	AAS	PHO	IOW	DCS	SON	IRW	PIR	MRP	CNS	MMP	AAS	PHO; 3			55th	165	
2011	Richard Childress Racing with Jim Offenbach	31	Chevy	PHO; 4	AAS	MMP	IOW	LVS	SON	IRW	EVG	PIR	CNS	MRP	SPO	AAS	PHO	68th	165	

Sporting positions
Preceded by Patrick Sheltra	ARCA Racing Series Champion; 2011	Succeeded by Chris Buescher
Achievements
Preceded by Joey Coulter	NASCAR Camping World Truck Series Rookie of the Year; 2012	Succeeded by Ryan Blaney
Preceded by Nelson Piquet Jr.	NASCAR Camping World Truck Series Most Popular Driver; 2013	Succeeded by Ryan Blaney
