= 2020 Drydene 311 (Sunday) =

NASCAR Cup Series race

Race details
- Race 25 of 36 in the 2020 NASCAR Cup Series
- The 2020 Drydene 311 program cover, featuring Jimmie Johnson's win at the 2012 FedEx 400.
- Date: August 23, 2020
- Location: Dover International Speedway in Dover, Delaware
- Course: Permanent racing facility
- Course length: 1 miles (1.6 km)
- Distance: 311 laps, 311 mi (500.399 km)
- Average speed: 110.994 miles per hour (178.628 km/h)

Pole position
Driver	Matt DiBenedetto	Wood Brothers Racing
- Grid positions set by partial inversion of previous race's finishing order

Most laps led
Driver	Kevin Harvick	Stewart-Haas Racing
- Laps: 223

Winner
No. 4	Kevin Harvick	Stewart-Haas Racing

Television in the United States
- Network: NBCSN
- Announcers: Rick Allen, Jeff Burton, Steve Letarte and Dale Earnhardt Jr.
- Nielsen ratings: 1.946 million

Radio in the United States
- Radio: MRN
- Booth announcers: Alex Hayden and Jeff Striegle
- Turn announcers: Mike Bagley (Backstretch)

The 2020 Drydene 311 was a NASCAR Cup Series race held on August 23, 2020, at Dover International Speedway in Dover, Delaware. Scheduled to be contested over 400 laps but shortened to 311 laps because of the doubleheader format on the 1-mile (1.6 km) concrete speedway, it was the 25th race of the 2020 NASCAR Cup Series season.

This was the final running of the second Dover race, as the track lost its second race to Nashville Superspeedway in 2021.

== Report ==
=== Background ===
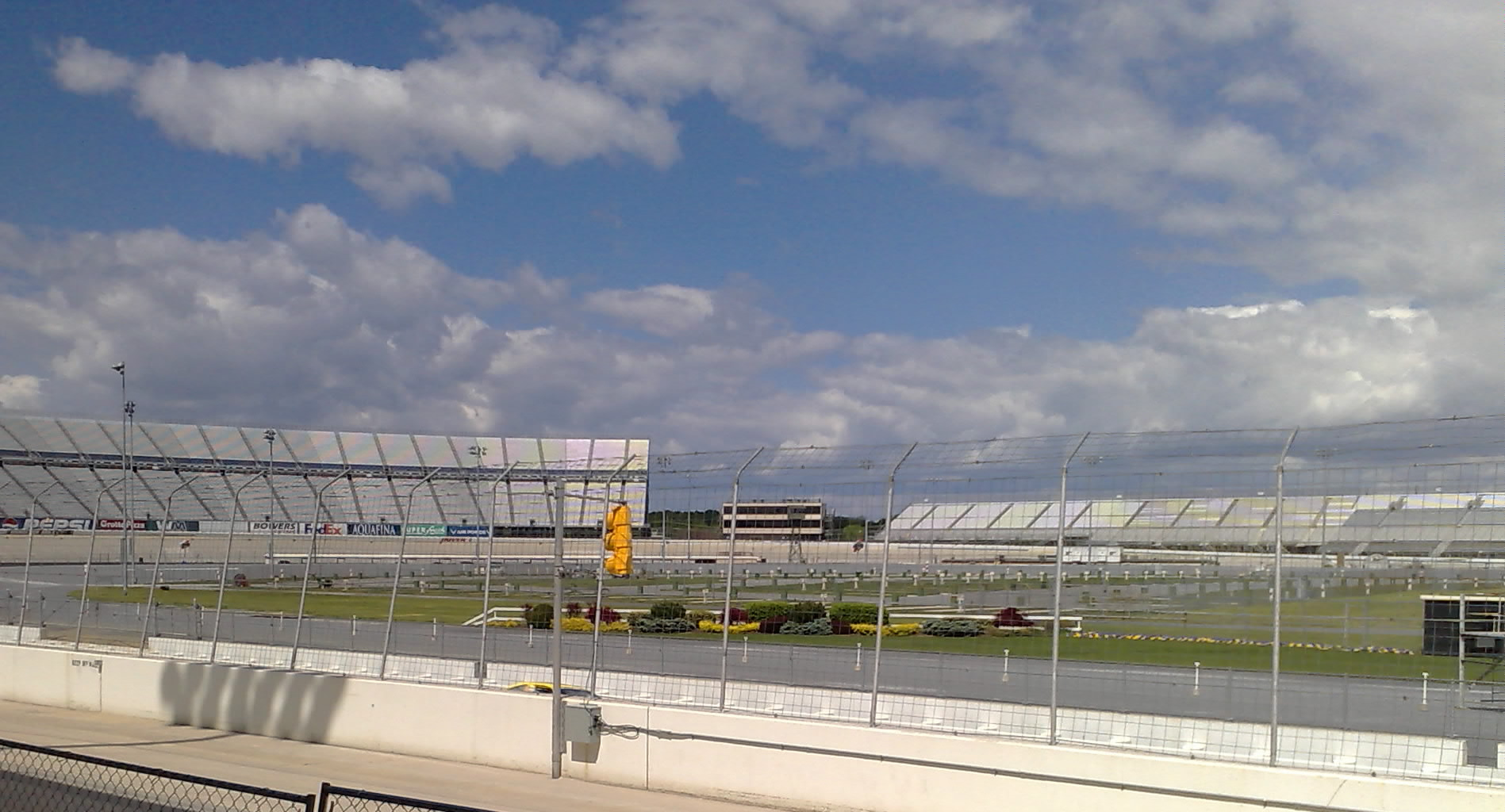
Dover International Speedway, the track where the race was held.

Dover International Speedway is an oval race track in Dover, Delaware, United States that has held at least two NASCAR races since it opened in 1969. In addition to NASCAR, the track also hosted USAC and the NTT IndyCar Series. The track features one layout, a 1 mile (1.6 km) concrete oval, with 24° banking in the turns and 9° banking on the straights. The speedway is owned and operated by Dover Motorsports.

The track, nicknamed "The Monster Mile", was built in 1969 by Melvin Joseph of Melvin L. Joseph Construction Company, Inc., with an asphalt surface, but was replaced with concrete in 1995. Six years later in 2001, the track's capacity moved to 135,000 seats, making the track have the largest capacity of sports venue in the mid-Atlantic. In 2002, the name changed to Dover International Speedway from Dover Downs International Speedway after Dover Downs Gaming and Entertainment split, making Dover Motorsports. From 2007 to 2009, the speedway worked on an improvement project called "The Monster Makeover", which expanded facilities at the track and beautified the track. After the 2014 season, the track's capacity was reduced to 95,500 seats.

==== Entry list ====
- (R) denotes rookie driver.
- (i) denotes driver who are ineligible for series driver points.

No.	Driver	Team	Manufacturer
00	Quin Houff (R)	StarCom Racing	Chevrolet
1	Kurt Busch	Chip Ganassi Racing	Chevrolet
2	Brad Keselowski	Team Penske	Ford
3	Austin Dillon	Richard Childress Racing	Chevrolet
4	Kevin Harvick	Stewart-Haas Racing	Ford
6	Ryan Newman	Roush Fenway Racing	Ford
7	Garrett Smithley (i)	Tommy Baldwin Racing	Chevrolet
8	Tyler Reddick (R)	Richard Childress Racing	Chevrolet
9	Chase Elliott	Hendrick Motorsports	Chevrolet
10	Aric Almirola	Stewart-Haas Racing	Ford
11	Denny Hamlin	Joe Gibbs Racing	Toyota
12	Ryan Blaney	Team Penske	Ford
13	Ty Dillon	Germain Racing	Chevrolet
14	Clint Bowyer	Stewart-Haas Racing	Ford
15	Brennan Poole (R)	Premium Motorsports	Chevrolet
17	Chris Buescher	Roush Fenway Racing	Ford
18	Kyle Busch	Joe Gibbs Racing	Toyota
19	Martin Truex Jr.	Joe Gibbs Racing	Toyota
20	Erik Jones	Joe Gibbs Racing	Toyota
21	Matt DiBenedetto	Wood Brothers Racing	Ford
22	Joey Logano	Team Penske	Ford
24	William Byron	Hendrick Motorsports	Chevrolet
27	J. J. Yeley (i)	Rick Ware Racing	Ford
32	Corey LaJoie	Go Fas Racing	Ford
34	Michael McDowell	Front Row Motorsports	Ford
37	Ryan Preece	JTG Daugherty Racing	Chevrolet
38	John Hunter Nemechek (R)	Front Row Motorsports	Ford
41	Cole Custer (R)	Stewart-Haas Racing	Ford
42	Matt Kenseth	Chip Ganassi Racing	Chevrolet
43	Bubba Wallace	Richard Petty Motorsports	Chevrolet
47	Ricky Stenhouse Jr.	JTG Daugherty Racing	Chevrolet
48	Jimmie Johnson	Hendrick Motorsports	Chevrolet
51	Joey Gase (i)	Petty Ware Racing	Ford
53	Josh Bilicki (i)	Rick Ware Racing	Chevrolet
66	Timmy Hill (i)	MBM Motorsports	Toyota
77	Reed Sorenson	Spire Motorsports	Chevrolet
78	B. J. McLeod (i)	B. J. McLeod Motorsports	Chevrolet
88	Alex Bowman	Hendrick Motorsports	Chevrolet
95	Christopher Bell (R)	Leavine Family Racing	Toyota
96	Daniel Suárez	Gaunt Brothers Racing	Toyota
Official entry list

== Qualifying ==
Matt DiBenedetto was awarded the pole for the race as determined by the top 20 from Saturday's finishing order inverted.

=== Starting Lineup ===
Pos	No.	Driver	Team	Manufacturer
1	21	Matt DiBenedetto	Wood Brothers Racing	Ford
2	6	Ryan Newman	Roush Fenway Racing	Ford
3	13	Ty Dillon	Germain Racing	Chevrolet
4	10	Aric Almirola	Stewart-Haas Racing	Ford
5	17	Chris Buescher	Roush Fenway Racing	Ford
6	3	Austin Dillon	Richard Childress Racing	Chevrolet
7	12	Ryan Blaney	Team Penske	Ford
8	8	Tyler Reddick (R)	Richard Childress Racing	Chevrolet
9	20	Erik Jones	Joe Gibbs Racing	Toyota
10	41	Cole Custer (R)	Stewart-Haas Racing	Ford
11	47	Ricky Stenhouse Jr.	JTG Daugherty Racing	Chevrolet
12	2	Brad Keselowski	Team Penske	Ford
13	22	Joey Logano	Team Penske	Ford
14	48	Jimmie Johnson	Hendrick Motorsports	Chevrolet
15	14	Clint Bowyer	Stewart-Haas Racing	Ford
16	9	Chase Elliott	Hendrick Motorsports	Chevrolet
17	4	Kevin Harvick	Stewart-Haas Racing	Ford
18	18	Kyle Busch	Joe Gibbs Racing	Toyota
19	19	Martin Truex Jr.	Joe Gibbs Racing	Toyota
20	11	Denny Hamlin	Joe Gibbs Racing	Toyota
21	88	Alex Bowman	Hendrick Motorsports	Chevrolet
22	95	Christopher Bell (R)	Leavine Family Racing	Toyota
23	42	Matt Kenseth	Chip Ganassi Racing	Chevrolet
24	38	John Hunter Nemechek (R)	Front Row Motorsports	Ford
25	37	Ryan Preece	JTG Daugherty Racing	Chevrolet
26	34	Michael McDowell	Front Row Motorsports	Ford
27	43	Bubba Wallace	Richard Petty Motorsports	Chevrolet
28	24	William Byron	Hendrick Motorsports	Chevrolet
29	32	Corey LaJoie	Go Fas Racing	Ford
30	96	Daniel Suárez	Gaunt Brothers Racing	Toyota
31	27	J. J. Yeley (i)	Rick Ware Racing	Ford
32	53	Josh Bilicki (i)	Rick Ware Racing	Chevrolet
33	00	Quin Houff (R)	StarCom Racing	Chevrolet
34	66	Timmy Hill (i)	MBM Motorsports	Toyota
35	51	Joey Gase (i)	Petty Ware Racing	Ford
36	15	Brennan Poole (R)	Premium Motorsports	Chevrolet
37	7	Garrett Smithley (i)	Tommy Baldwin Racing	Chevrolet
38	78	B. J. McLeod (i)	B. J. McLeod Motorsports	Chevrolet
39	77	Reed Sorenson	Spire Motorsports	Chevrolet
40	1	Kurt Busch	Chip Ganassi Racing	Chevrolet
Official starting lineup

== Race ==
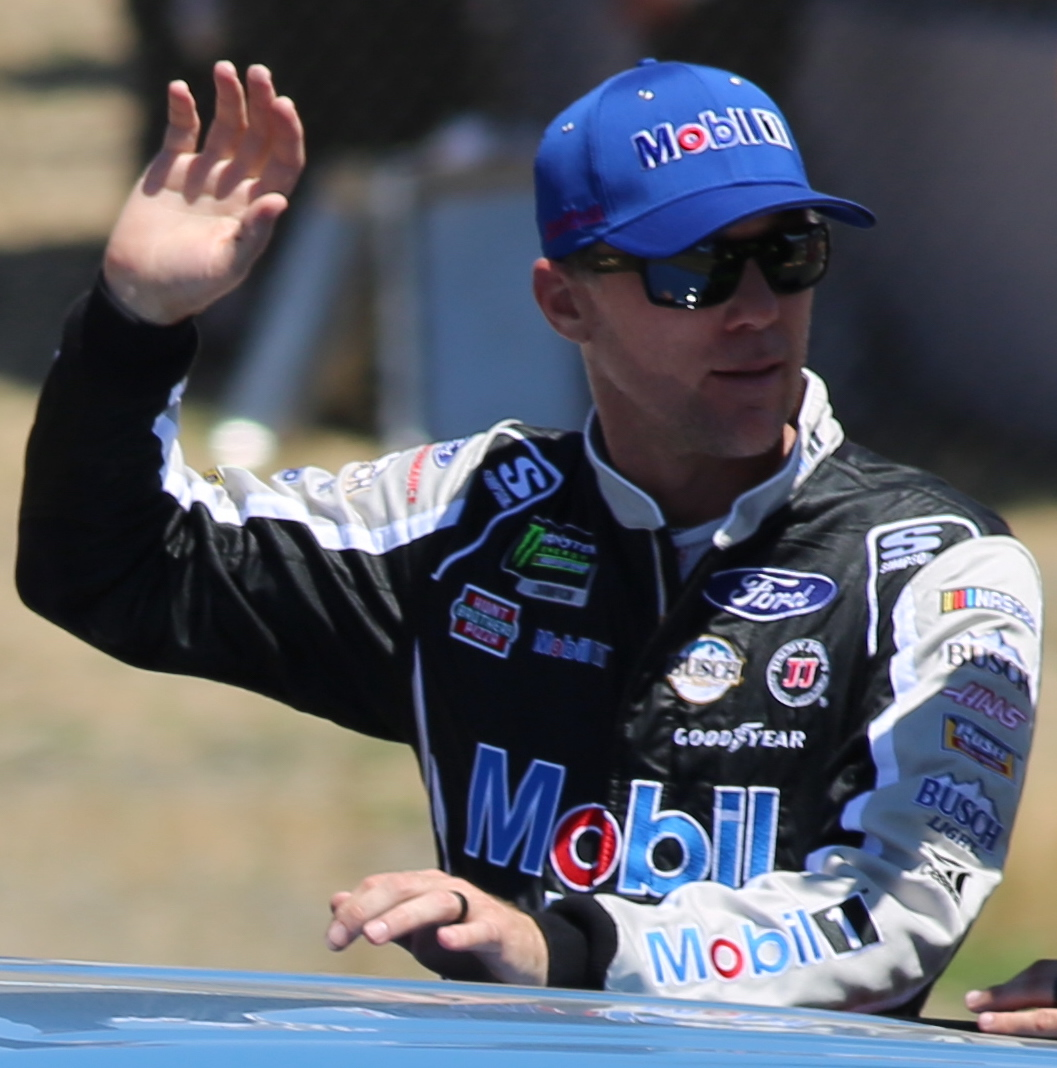
Kevin Harvick won the race.

=== Stage Results ===
Stage One Laps: 70

Pos	No	Driver	Team	Manufacturer	Points
1	4	Kevin Harvick	Stewart-Haas Racing	Ford	10
2	12	Ryan Blaney	Team Penske	Ford	9
3	24	William Byron	Hendrick Motorsports	Chevrolet	8
4	10	Aric Almirola	Stewart-Haas Racing	Ford	7
5	2	Brad Keselowski	Team Penske	Ford	6
6	22	Joey Logano	Team Penske	Ford	5
7	21	Matt DiBenedetto	Wood Brothers Racing	Ford	4
8	48	Jimmie Johnson	Hendrick Motorsports	Chevrolet	3
9	1	Kurt Busch	Chip Ganassi Racing	Chevrolet	2
10	3	Austin Dillon	Richard Childress Racing	Chevrolet	1
Official stage one results

Stage Two Laps: 115

Pos	No	Driver	Team	Manufacturer	Points
1	4	Kevin Harvick	Stewart-Haas Racing	Ford	10
2	22	Joey Logano	Team Penske	Ford	9
3	11	Denny Hamlin	Joe Gibbs Racing	Toyota	8
4	19	Martin Truex Jr.	Joe Gibbs Racing	Toyota	7
5	12	Ryan Blaney	Team Penske	Ford	6
6	24	William Byron	Hendrick Motorsports	Chevrolet	5
7	88	Alex Bowman	Hendrick Motorsports	Chevrolet	4
8	41	Cole Custer (R)	Stewart-Haas Racing	Ford	3
9	48	Jimmie Johnson	Hendrick Motorsports	Chevrolet	2
10	2	Brad Keselowski	Team Penske	Ford	1
Official stage two results

=== Final Stage Results ===
Stage Three Laps: 126

Pos	Grid	No	Driver	Team	Manufacturer	Laps	Points
1	17	4	Kevin Harvick	Stewart-Haas Racing	Ford	311	60
2	19	19	Martin Truex Jr.	Joe Gibbs Racing	Toyota	311	42
3	14	48	Jimmie Johnson	Hendrick Motorsports	Chevrolet	311	39
4	23	24	William Byron	Hendrick Motorsports	Chevrolet	311	46
5	21	88	Alex Bowman	Hendrick Motorsports	Chevrolet	311	36
6	13	22	Joey Logano	Team Penske	Ford	311	45
7	4	10	Aric Almirola	Stewart-Haas Racing	Ford	311	37
8	12	2	Brad Keselowski	Team Penske	Ford	311	36
9	6	3	Austin Dillon	Richard Childress Racing	Chevrolet	311	29
10	10	41	Cole Custer (R)	Stewart-Haas Racing	Ford	311	30
11	18	18	Kyle Busch	Joe Gibbs Racing	Toyota	311	26
12	7	12	Ryan Blaney	Team Penske	Ford	311	40
13	28	1	Kurt Busch	Chip Ganassi Racing	Chevrolet	311	26
14	5	17	Chris Buescher	Roush Fenway Racing	Ford	311	23
15	22	42	Matt Kenseth	Chip Ganassi Racing	Chevrolet	311	22
16	15	14	Clint Bowyer	Stewart-Haas Racing	Ford	311	21
17	1	21	Matt DiBenedetto	Wood Brothers Racing	Ford	311	24
18	8	8	Tyler Reddick (R)	Richard Childress Racing	Chevrolet	311	19
19	20	11	Denny Hamlin	Joe Gibbs Racing	Toyota	311	26
20	27	38	John Hunter Nemechek (R)	Front Row Motorsports	Ford	311	17
21	26	43	Bubba Wallace	Richard Petty Motorsports	Chevrolet	311	16
22	9	20	Erik Jones	Joe Gibbs Racing	Toyota	310	15
23	30	32	Corey LaJoie	Go Fas Racing	Ford	310	14
24	2	6	Ryan Newman	Roush Fenway Racing	Ford	310	13
25	25	34	Michael McDowell	Front Row Motorsports	Ford	310	12
26	29	37	Ryan Preece	JTG Daugherty Racing	Chevrolet	310	11
27	24	95	Christopher Bell (R)	Leavine Family Racing	Toyota	310	10
28	31	96	Daniel Suárez	Gaunt Brothers Racing	Toyota	309	9
29	3	13	Ty Dillon	Germain Racing	Chevrolet	309	8
30	34	15	Brennan Poole (R)	Premium Motorsports	Chevrolet	305	7
31	40	78	B. J. McLeod (i)	B. J. McLeod Motorsports	Chevrolet	303	0
32	33	53	Josh Bilicki (i)	Rick Ware Racing	Chevrolet	302	0
33	37	77	Reed Sorenson	Spire Motorsports	Chevrolet	302	4
34	35	00	Quin Houff (R)	StarCom Racing	Chevrolet	302	3
35	39	7	Garrett Smithley (i)	Tommy Baldwin Racing	Chevrolet	296	0
36	36	66	Timmy Hill (i)	MBM Motorsports	Toyota	252	0
37	11	47	Ricky Stenhouse Jr.	JTG Daugherty Racing	Chevrolet	215	1
38	31	27	J. J. Yeley (i)	Rick Ware Racing	Ford	110	0
39	16	9	Chase Elliott	Hendrick Motorsports	Chevrolet	6	1
40	35	51	Joey Gase (i)	Petty Ware Racing	Ford	4	0
Official race results

=== Race statistics ===
- Lead changes: 15 among 6 different drivers
- Cautions/Laps: 7 for 40
- Red flags: 1 for 12 minutes and 19 seconds
- Time of race: 2 hours, 48 minutes and 7 seconds
- Average speed: 110.994 miles per hour (178.628 km/h)

== Media ==
=== Television ===
NBC Sports covered the race on the television side. Rick Allen, 2006 race winner Jeff Burton, Steve Letarte and 2001 race winner Dale Earnhardt Jr. covered the race from the booth at Charlotte Motor Speedway. Dave Burns, Parker Kligerman and Dillon Welch handled the pit road duties on site.

NBCSN
Booth announcers	Pit reporters
Lap-by-lap: Rick Allen; Color-commentator: Jeff Burton; Color-commentator: Steve Letarte; Color-commentator: Dale Earnhardt Jr.	Dave Burns; Parker Kligerman; Dillon Welch

=== Radio ===
MRN had the radio call for the race, which was also simulcast on Sirius XM NASCAR Radio.

MRN Radio
Booth announcers	Turn announcers	Pit reporters
Lead announcer: Alex Hayden; Announcer: Jeff Striegle	Backstretch: Mike Bagley	Steve Post; Kim Coon

== Standings after the race ==
Drivers' Championship standings

	Pos	Driver	Points
	1	Kevin Harvick	1,041
	2	Denny Hamlin	907 (–134)
	3	Brad Keselowski	881 (–160)
1	4	Martin Truex Jr.	845 (–196)
1	5	Joey Logano	836 (–205)
1	6	Ryan Blaney	818 (–223)
3	7	Chase Elliott	809 (–232)
	8	Aric Almirola	740 (–301)
	9	Kyle Busch	719 (–322)
	10	Kurt Busch	700 (–341)
	11	Clint Bowyer	685 (–356)
	12	Alex Bowman	662 (–379)
	13	Matt DiBenedetto	637 (–404)
1	14	William Byron	632 (–409)
1	15	Jimmie Johnson	628 (–413)
	16	Erik Jones	582 (–459)
Official driver's standings

Manufacturers' Championship standings

Pos	Manufacturer	Points
1	Ford	933
2	Toyota	880 (–53)
3	Chevrolet	831 (–102)

- Note: Only the first 16 positions are included for the driver standings.
- . – Driver has clinched a position in the NASCAR Cup Series playoffs.

Previous race: 2020 Drydene 311	NASCAR Cup Series; 2020 season	Next race: 2020 Coke Zero Sugar 400
