= 2020 Drydene 311 (Saturday) =

NASCAR Cup Series race

Race details
- Race 24 of 36 in the 2020 NASCAR Cup Series
- The 2020 Drydene 311 program cover, featuring Jimmie Johnson's win at the 2012 FedEx 400.
- Date: August 22, 2020
- Location: Dover International Speedway in Dover, Delaware
- Course: Permanent racing facility
- Course length: 1 miles (1.6 km)
- Distance: 311 laps, 311 mi (500.399 km)
- Average speed: 124.359 miles per hour (200.136 km/h)

Pole position
Driver	Chase Elliott	Hendrick Motorsports
- Grid positions set by competition-based formula

Most laps led
Driver	Denny Hamlin	Joe Gibbs Racing
- Laps: 115

Winner
No. 11	Denny Hamlin	Joe Gibbs Racing

Television in the United States
- Network: NBCSN
- Announcers: Rick Allen, Jeff Burton, Steve Letarte and Dale Earnhardt Jr.
- Nielsen ratings: 1.771 million

Radio in the United States
- Radio: MRN
- Booth announcers: Alex Hayden and Jeff Striegle
- Turn announcers: Mike Bagley (Backstretch)

The 2020 Drydene 311 was a NASCAR Cup Series race that was originally scheduled to be held on May 3, 2020, but postponed to August 22, 2020, at Dover International Speedway in Dover, Delaware. Scheduled to be contested over 400 laps but shortened to 311 laps because of the 500-kilometer doubleheader format used on the 1-mile (1.6 km) concrete speedway, it was the 24th race of the 2020 NASCAR Cup Series season. It was the first 300-mile Cup Series race since 1970 at Dover.

There were three stages, each ending at 70, 115 & 126.

== Report ==
=== Background ===
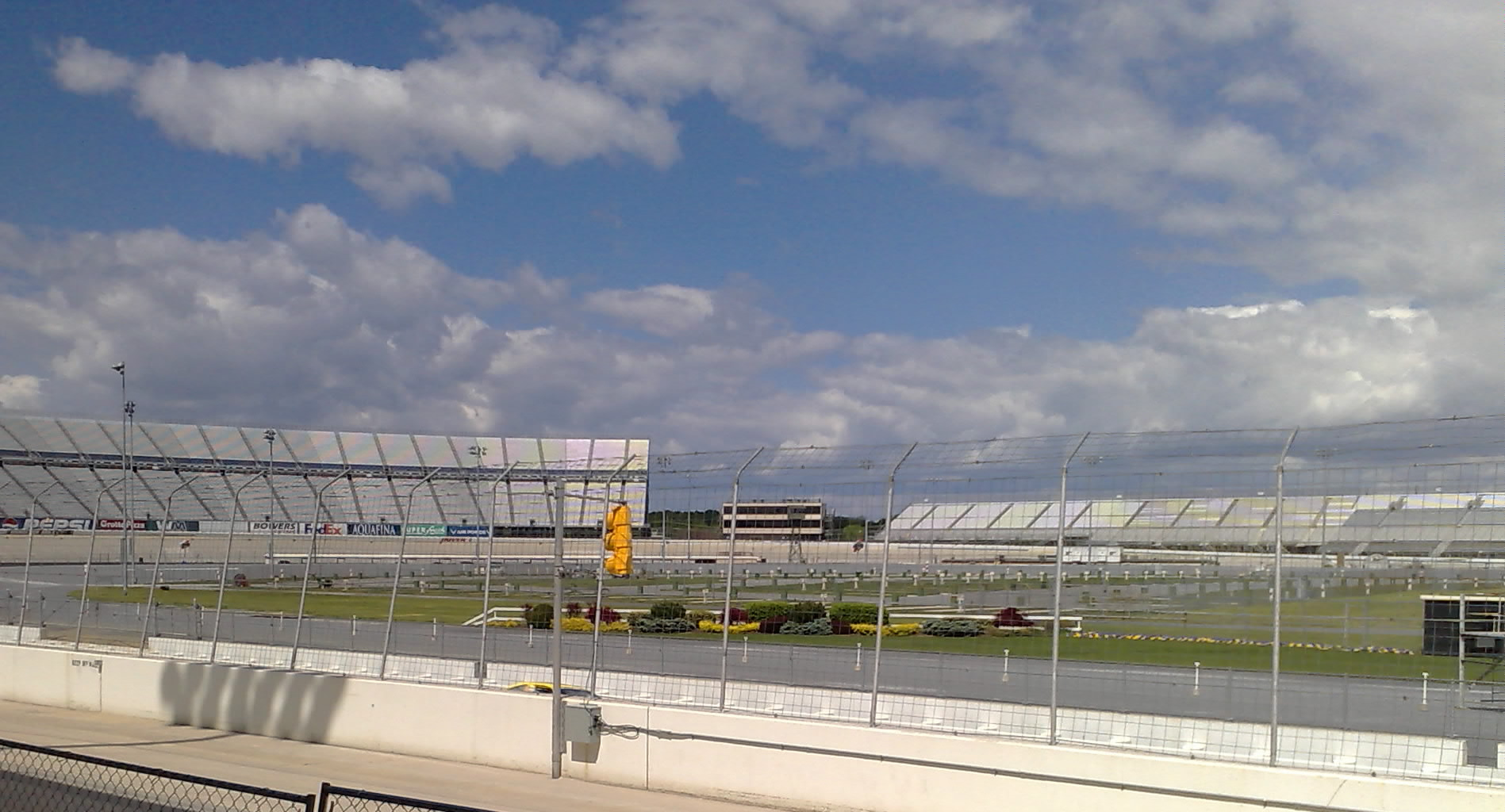
Dover International Speedway, the track where the race was held.

Dover International Speedway is an oval race track in Dover, Delaware, United States that has held at least two NASCAR races since it opened in 1969. In addition to NASCAR, the track also hosted USAC and the NTT IndyCar Series. The track features one layout, a 1 mile (1.6 km) concrete oval, with 24° banking in the turns and 9° banking on the straights. The speedway is owned and operated by Dover Motorsports.

The track, nicknamed "The Monster Mile", was built in 1969 by Melvin Joseph of Melvin L. Joseph Construction Company, Inc., with an asphalt surface, but was replaced with concrete in 1995. Six years later in 2001, the track's capacity moved to 135,000 seats, making the track have the largest capacity of sports venue in the mid-Atlantic. In 2002, the name changed to Dover International Speedway from Dover Downs International Speedway after Dover Downs Gaming and Entertainment split, making Dover Motorsports. From 2007 to 2009, the speedway worked on an improvement project called "The Monster Makeover", which expanded facilities at the track and beautified the track. After the 2014 season, the track's capacity was reduced to 95,500 seats.

==== Entry list ====
- (R) denotes rookie driver.
- (i) denotes driver who are ineligible for series driver points.

No.	Driver	Team	Manufacturer
00	Quin Houff (R)	StarCom Racing	Chevrolet
1	Kurt Busch	Chip Ganassi Racing	Chevrolet
2	Brad Keselowski	Team Penske	Ford
3	Austin Dillon	Richard Childress Racing	Chevrolet
4	Kevin Harvick	Stewart-Haas Racing	Ford
6	Ryan Newman	Roush Fenway Racing	Ford
7	Garrett Smithley (i)	Tommy Baldwin Racing	Chevrolet
8	Tyler Reddick (R)	Richard Childress Racing	Chevrolet
9	Chase Elliott	Hendrick Motorsports	Chevrolet
10	Aric Almirola	Stewart-Haas Racing	Ford
11	Denny Hamlin	Joe Gibbs Racing	Toyota
12	Ryan Blaney	Team Penske	Ford
13	Ty Dillon	Germain Racing	Chevrolet
14	Clint Bowyer	Stewart-Haas Racing	Ford
15	Brennan Poole (R)	Premium Motorsports	Chevrolet
17	Chris Buescher	Roush Fenway Racing	Ford
18	Kyle Busch	Joe Gibbs Racing	Toyota
19	Martin Truex Jr.	Joe Gibbs Racing	Toyota
20	Erik Jones	Joe Gibbs Racing	Toyota
21	Matt DiBenedetto	Wood Brothers Racing	Ford
22	Joey Logano	Team Penske	Ford
24	William Byron	Hendrick Motorsports	Chevrolet
27	J. J. Yeley (i)	Rick Ware Racing	Ford
32	Corey LaJoie	Go Fas Racing	Ford
34	Michael McDowell	Front Row Motorsports	Ford
37	Ryan Preece	JTG Daugherty Racing	Chevrolet
38	John Hunter Nemechek (R)	Front Row Motorsports	Ford
41	Cole Custer (R)	Stewart-Haas Racing	Ford
42	Matt Kenseth	Chip Ganassi Racing	Chevrolet
43	Bubba Wallace	Richard Petty Motorsports	Chevrolet
47	Ricky Stenhouse Jr.	JTG Daugherty Racing	Chevrolet
48	Jimmie Johnson	Hendrick Motorsports	Chevrolet
51	Joey Gase (i)	Petty Ware Racing	Ford
53	Josh Bilicki (i)	Rick Ware Racing	Chevrolet
66	Timmy Hill (i)	MBM Motorsports	Toyota
77	Reed Sorenson	Spire Motorsports	Chevrolet
78	B. J. McLeod (i)	B. J. McLeod Motorsports	Chevrolet
88	Alex Bowman	Hendrick Motorsports	Chevrolet
95	Christopher Bell (R)	Leavine Family Racing	Toyota
96	Daniel Suárez	Gaunt Brothers Racing	Toyota
Official entry list

== Qualifying ==
Chase Elliott was awarded the pole for the race as determined by competition-based formula.

=== Starting Lineup ===
Pos	No.	Driver	Team	Manufacturer
1	9	Chase Elliott	Hendrick Motorsports	Chevrolet
2	11	Denny Hamlin	Joe Gibbs Racing	Toyota
3	19	Martin Truex Jr.	Joe Gibbs Racing	Toyota
4	14	Clint Bowyer	Stewart-Haas Racing	Ford
5	22	Joey Logano	Team Penske	Ford
6	48	Jimmie Johnson	Hendrick Motorsports	Chevrolet
7	2	Brad Keselowski	Team Penske	Ford
8	24	William Byron	Hendrick Motorsports	Chevrolet
9	1	Kurt Busch	Chip Ganassi Racing	Chevrolet
10	4	Kevin Harvick	Stewart-Haas Racing	Ford
11	88	Alex Bowman	Hendrick Motorsports	Chevrolet
12	17	Chris Buescher	Roush Fenway Racing	Ford
13	20	Erik Jones	Joe Gibbs Racing	Toyota
14	21	Matt DiBenedetto	Wood Brothers Racing	Ford
15	34	Michael McDowell	Front Row Motorsports	Ford
16	8	Tyler Reddick (R)	Richard Childress Racing	Chevrolet
17	10	Aric Almirola	Stewart-Haas Racing	Ford
18	95	Christopher Bell (R)	Leavine Family Racing	Toyota
19	47	Ricky Stenhouse Jr.	JTG Daugherty Racing	Chevrolet
20	12	Ryan Blaney	Team Penske	Ford
21	41	Cole Custer (R)	Stewart-Haas Racing	Ford
22	18	Kyle Busch	Joe Gibbs Racing	Toyota
23	6	Ryan Newman	Roush Fenway Racing	Ford
24	43	Bubba Wallace	Richard Petty Motorsports	Chevrolet
25	13	Ty Dillon	Germain Racing	Chevrolet
26	42	Matt Kenseth	Chip Ganassi Racing	Chevrolet
27	37	Ryan Preece	JTG Daugherty Racing	Chevrolet
28	96	Daniel Suárez	Gaunt Brothers Racing	Toyota
29	32	Corey LaJoie	Go Fas Racing	Ford
30	15	Brennan Poole (R)	Premium Motorsports	Chevrolet
31	38	John Hunter Nemechek (R)	Front Row Motorsports	Ford
32	3	Austin Dillon	Richard Childress Racing	Chevrolet
33	66	Timmy Hill (i)	MBM Motorsports	Toyota
34	27	J. J. Yeley (i)	Rick Ware Racing	Ford
35	00	Quin Houff (R)	StarCom Racing	Chevrolet
36	77	Reed Sorenson	Spire Motorsports	Chevrolet
37	53	Josh Bilicki (i)	Rick Ware Racing	Chevrolet
38	51	Joey Gase (i)	Petty Ware Racing	Ford
39	7	Garrett Smithley (i)	Tommy Baldwin Racing	Chevrolet
40	78	B. J. McLeod (i)	B. J. McLeod Motorsports	Chevrolet
Official starting lineup

== Race ==
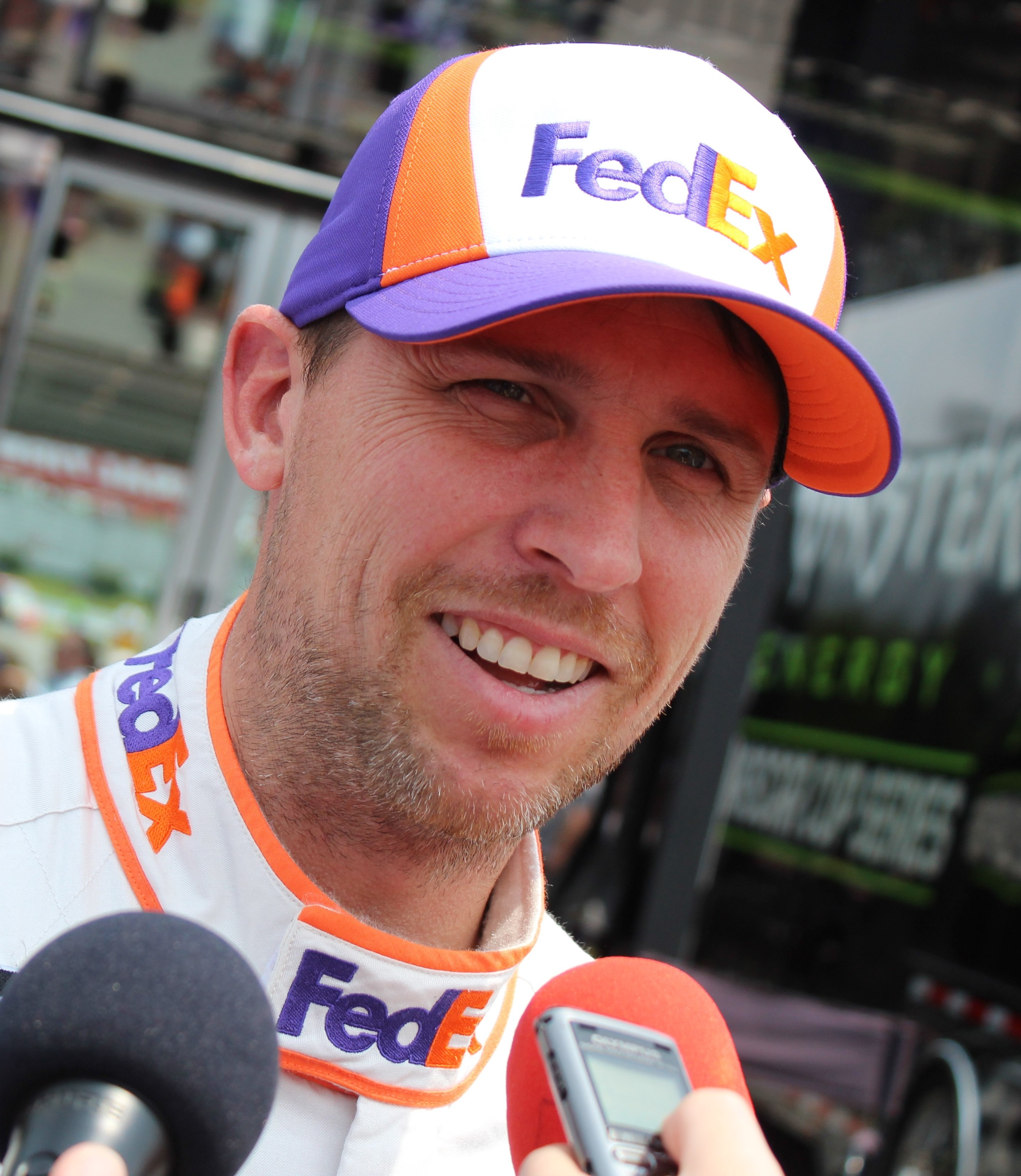
Denny Hamlin won the race.

=== Stage Results ===
Stage One Laps: 70

Pos	No	Driver	Team	Manufacturer	Points
1	11	Denny Hamlin	Joe Gibbs Racing	Toyota	10
2	3	Austin Dillon	Richard Childress Racing	Chevrolet	9
3	2	Brad Keselowski	Team Penske	Ford	8
4	14	Clint Bowyer	Stewart-Haas Racing	Ford	7
5	19	Martin Truex Jr.	Joe Gibbs Racing	Toyota	6
6	22	Joey Logano	Team Penske	Ford	5
7	4	Kevin Harvick	Stewart-Haas Racing	Ford	4
8	48	Jimmie Johnson	Hendrick Motorsports	Chevrolet	3
9	17	Chris Buescher	Roush Fenway Racing	Ford	2
10	10	Aric Almirola	Stewart-Haas Racing	Ford	1
Official stage one results

Stage Two Laps: 115

Pos	No	Driver	Team	Manufacturer	Points
1	11	Denny Hamlin	Joe Gibbs Racing	Toyota	10
2	19	Martin Truex Jr.	Joe Gibbs Racing	Toyota	9
3	14	Clint Bowyer	Stewart-Haas Racing	Ford	8
4	18	Kyle Busch	Joe Gibbs Racing	Toyota	7
5	2	Brad Keselowski	Team Penske	Ford	6
6	4	Kevin Harvick	Stewart-Haas Racing	Ford	5
7	48	Jimmie Johnson	Hendrick Motorsports	Chevrolet	4
8	22	Joey Logano	Team Penske	Ford	3
9	47	Ricky Stenhouse Jr.	JTG Daugherty Racing	Chevrolet	2
10	9	Chase Elliott	Hendrick Motorsports	Chevrolet	1
Official stage two results

=== Final Stage Results ===
Stage Three Laps: 126

Pos	Grid	No	Driver	Team	Manufacturer	Laps	Points
1	2	11	Denny Hamlin	Joe Gibbs Racing	Toyota	311	60
2	3	19	Martin Truex Jr.	Joe Gibbs Racing	Toyota	311	50
3	22	18	Kyle Busch	Joe Gibbs Racing	Toyota	311	41
4	10	4	Kevin Harvick	Stewart-Haas Racing	Ford	311	42
5	1	9	Chase Elliott	Hendrick Motorsports	Chevrolet	311	33
6	4	14	Clint Bowyer	Stewart-Haas Racing	Ford	311	46
7	6	48	Jimmie Johnson	Hendrick Motorsports	Chevrolet	311	37
8	5	22	Joey Logano	Team Penske	Ford	311	37
9	7	2	Brad Keselowski	Team Penske	Ford	311	42
10	19	47	Ricky Stenhouse Jr.	JTG Daugherty Racing	Chevrolet	311	29
11	21	41	Cole Custer (R)	Stewart-Haas Racing	Ford	311	26
12	13	20	Erik Jones	Joe Gibbs Racing	Toyota	311	25
13	16	8	Tyler Reddick (R)	Richard Childress Racing	Chevrolet	310	24
14	20	12	Ryan Blaney	Team Penske	Ford	310	23
15	32	3	Austin Dillon	Richard Childress Racing	Chevrolet	310	31
16	12	17	Chris Buescher	Roush Fenway Racing	Ford	310	23
17	17	10	Aric Almirola	Stewart-Haas Racing	Ford	309	21
18	25	13	Ty Dillon	Germain Racing	Chevrolet	309	19
19	23	6	Ryan Newman	Roush Fenway Racing	Ford	309	18
20	14	21	Matt DiBenedetto	Wood Brothers Racing	Ford	309	17
21	11	88	Alex Bowman	Hendrick Motorsports	Chevrolet	309	16
22	18	95	Christopher Bell (R)	Leavine Family Racing	Toyota	309	15
23	26	42	Matt Kenseth	Chip Ganassi Racing	Chevrolet	309	14
24	31	38	John Hunter Nemechek (R)	Front Row Motorsports	Ford	309	13
25	27	37	Ryan Preece	JTG Daugherty Racing	Chevrolet	309	12
26	15	34	Michael McDowell	Front Row Motorsports	Ford	308	11
27	24	43	Bubba Wallace	Richard Petty Motorsports	Chevrolet	308	10
28	8	24	William Byron	Hendrick Motorsports	Chevrolet	308	9
29	29	32	Corey LaJoie	Go Fas Racing	Ford	308	8
30	28	96	Daniel Suárez	Gaunt Brothers Racing	Toyota	306	7
31	34	27	J. J. Yeley (i)	Rick Ware Racing	Ford	302	0
32	37	53	Josh Bilicki (i)	Rick Ware Racing	Chevrolet	299	0
33	35	00	Quin Houff (R)	StarCom Racing	Chevrolet	298	4
34	33	66	Timmy Hill (i)	MBM Motorsports	Toyota	298	0
35	38	51	Joey Gase (i)	Petty Ware Racing	Ford	293	0
36	30	15	Brennan Poole (R)	Premium Motorsports	Chevrolet	286	1
37	39	7	Garrett Smithley (i)	Tommy Baldwin Racing	Chevrolet	241	0
38	40	78	B. J. McLeod (i)	B. J. McLeod Motorsports	Chevrolet	166	0
39	36	77	Reed Sorenson	Spire Motorsports	Chevrolet	83	1
40	9	1	Kurt Busch	Chip Ganassi Racing	Chevrolet	6	1
Official race results

=== Race statistics ===
- Lead changes: 15 among 10 different drivers
- Cautions/Laps: 4 for 21
- Red flags: 0
- Time of race: 2 hours, 30 minutes and 3 seconds
- Average speed: 124.359 miles per hour (200.136 km/h)

== Media ==
=== Television ===
NBC Sports covered the race on the television side. Rick Allen, 2006 race winner Jeff Burton, Steve Letarte and 2001 race winner Dale Earnhardt Jr. covered the race from the booth at Charlotte Motor Speedway. Dave Burns, Parker Kligerman and Dillon Welch handled the pit road duties on site.

NBCSN
Booth announcers	Pit reporters
Lap-by-lap: Rick Allen; Color-commentator: Jeff Burton; Color-commentator: Steve Letarte; Color-commentator: Dale Earnhardt Jr.	Dave Burns; Parker Kligerman; Dillon Welch

=== Radio ===
MRN had the radio call for the race, which was also simulcast on Sirius XM NASCAR Radio.

MRN Radio
Booth announcers	Turn announcers	Pit reporters
Lead announcer: Alex Hayden; Announcer: Jeff Striegle	Backstretch: Mike Bagley	Steve Post; Kim Coon

== Standings after the race ==
Drivers' Championship standings

	Pos	Driver	Points
	1	Kevin Harvick	981
	2	Denny Hamlin	881 (–100)
	3	Brad Keselowski	845 (–136)
	4	Chase Elliott	808 (–173)
2	5	Martin Truex Jr.	803 (–178)
	6	Joey Logano	791 (–190)
2	7	Ryan Blaney	778 (–203)
	8	Aric Almirola	703 (–278)
1	9	Kyle Busch	693 (–288)
1	10	Kurt Busch	674 (–307)
	11	Clint Bowyer	664 (–317)
	12	Alex Bowman	626 (–355)
	13	Matt DiBenedetto	613 (–368)
1	14	Jimmie Johnson	589 (–392)
1	15	William Byron	586 (–395)
	16	Erik Jones	567 (–414)
Official driver's standings

Manufacturers' Championship standings

Pos	Manufacturer	Points
1	Ford	893
2	Toyota	845 (–48)
3	Chevrolet	797 (–96)

- Note: Only the first 16 positions are included for the driver standings.
- . – Driver has clinched a position in the NASCAR Cup Series playoffs.

Previous race: 2020 Go Bowling 235	NASCAR Cup Series; 2020 season	Next race: 2020 Drydene 311
