= Justin Lofton =

American racing driver (born 1986)

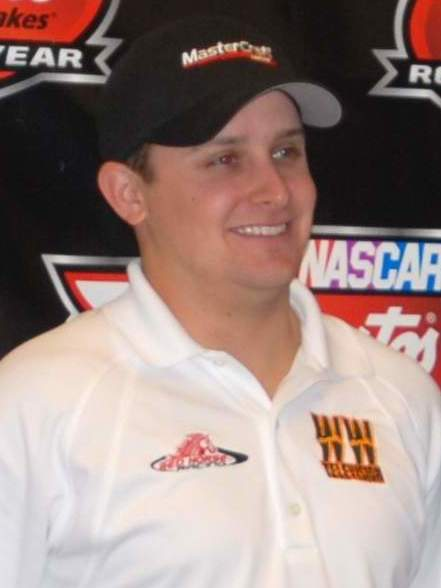
- Lofton in 2010
- Born: February 18, 1986 (age 40); Brawley, California, U.S.
- Achievements: 2009 ARCA Re/Max Series Champion

NASCAR O'Reilly Auto Parts Series career
- 4 races run over 2 years
- Best finish: 90th (2010)
- First race: 2009 Carfax 250 (Michigan)
- Last race: 2010 Dollar General 300 (Chicago)
Wins	Top tens	Poles
0	0	0

NASCAR FedEx Freight Truck Series career
- 84 races run over 5 years
- 2014 position: 33rd
- Best finish: 8th (2012)
- First race: 2010 NextEra Energy Resources 250 (Daytona)
- Last race: 2014 Pocono Mountains 150 (Pocono)
- First win: 2012 North Carolina Education Lottery 200 (Charlotte)
Wins	Top tens	Poles
1	29	2
- Statistics up to date as of November 1, 2020.

Justin William Lofton (born February 18, 1986) is an American professional off-road racing driver. He has also competed in stock car racing, last driving part-time in the ARCA Menards Series West in the No. 30 Ford for Rette Jones Racing. Lofton formerly competed in stock car racing full-time, competing in the ARCA Racing Series, NASCAR Camping World Truck Series, and NASCAR West Series. He is the 2009 ARCA champion.

== Racing career ==
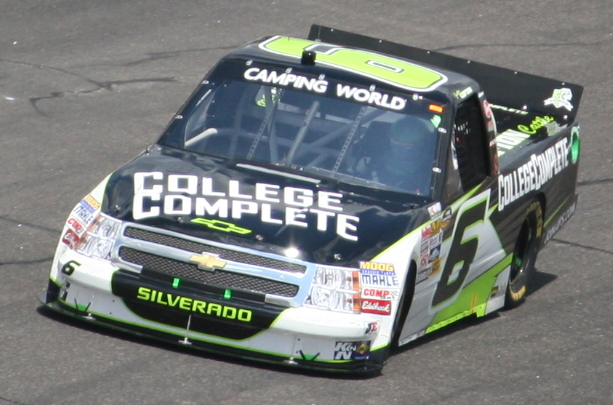
Lofton's No. 6 truck at Rockingham Speedway in 2012

Lofton started his racing career in mountain bikes before moving to late models. He went on to run in both the NASCAR Camping World East and West Series, before landing in the ARCA Re/Max Series. In 2008, he began driving full-time for Eddie Sharp Racing, first driving the No. 93 before moving to the No. 20 for the remainder of the season. He earned his first career win that year at Michigan International Speedway, and would finish 13th in the standings.

Lofton narrowly won the 2009 ARCA Series championship over Parker Kligerman in his sophomore season. Throughout the season, he earned six wins, 15 top-fives, 19 top-tens, and five poles. In 2009, Lofton also made his Nationwide Series debut at Michigan. Driving the No. 14 Lofton Cattle Toyota for CJM Racing, he qualified 19th and finished 16th.

In 2010, Lofton drove the No. 7 VisitPIT.com Toyota for Red Horse Racing. He also ran a partial schedule in the Nationwide Series, driving the No. 71 Weekend Warriors TV Toyota for the same team, and the No. 27 Ford for Baker Curb Racing.

In 2010, Lofton had a best qualifying effort of third in Darlington, a best finish of third at Dover, and earned four top-five and eight top-ten finishes in the Camping World Truck Series. He finished 12th in the driver point standings.

For 2011, Lofton joined defending champion team Germain Racing to drive the 77 truck. However, after Texas, Lofton and Germain parted ways. On June 22, Lofton announced on Sirius NASCAR Radio that he would return to Eddie Sharp Racing for the remainder of the season. He debuted in the No. 46 CollegeComplete.com Toyota at Kentucky Speedway on July 7 with a 15th-place finish. Starting July 22, 2011 in Nashville, Lofton returned to the No. 6 where he previously won the ARCA series in 2009 in the No. 6.

Lofton drove the full season for Eddie Sharp Racing in the Camping World Truck Series, driving the No. 6 for the 2012 season.

On May 18, 2012, at Charlotte Motor Speedway, Lofton captured his first win, holding off Brad Keselowski and Todd Bodine.

Lofton returned to racing stock cars for the first time since 2014 when he made his first West Series start since 2007 at Phoenix in November 2020, driving for Rette Jones Racing in the No. 30 car. He would finish the race in sixth.

=== Off-road racing ===
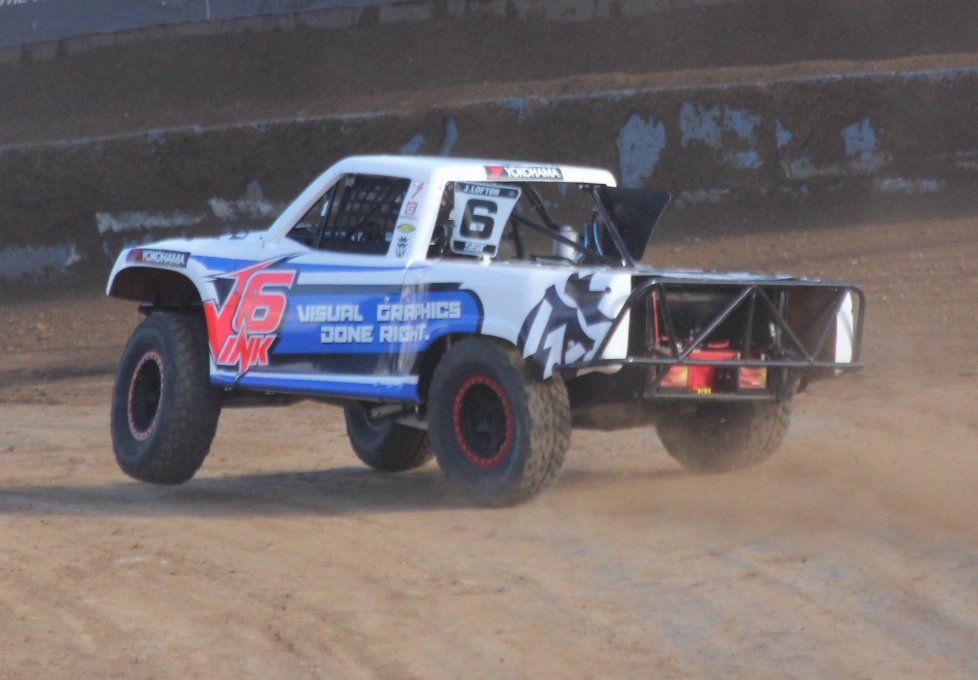
Lofton's 2013 SST at Crandon

After the 2012 season, Lofton announced that he would be scaling back his NASCAR schedule in 2013, instead primarily competing in the new Stadium Super Trucks being promoted by Robby Gordon. He collected three wins and resulted third in the standings behind Gordon and Rob MacCachren. In 2014 he competed at the St. Petersburg, X Games Austin, and Las Vegas rounds of the Stadium Super Trucks.

Lofton won the Best in the Desert Mint 400 overall and Trick Truck class in 2015, 2016 and 2019.

Lofton currently drives the Fox, Yokohama Tires sponsored Trophy Truck.

== Motorsports career results ==
=== NASCAR ===
(key) (Bold – Pole position awarded by qualifying time. Italics – Pole position earned by points standings or practice time. * – Most laps led.)

==== Nationwide Series ====
NASCAR Nationwide Series results
Year	Team	No.	Make	1	2	3	4	5	6	7	8	9	10	11	12	13	14	15	16	17	18	19	20	21	22	23	24	25	26	27	28	29	30	31	32	33	34	35	NNSC	Pts	Ref
2009	CJM Racing	14	Toyota	DAY	CAL	LVS	BRI	TEX	NSH	PHO	TAL	RCH	DAR	CLT	DOV	NSH	KEN	MLW	NHA	DAY	CHI	GTY	IRP	IOW	GLN	MCH; 16	BRI	CGV	ATL	RCH	DOV	KAN	CAL	CLT	MEM	TEX	PHO	HOM	125th	115	
2010	Red Horse Racing	71	Toyota	DAY	CAL	LVS	BRI	NSH	PHO	TEX; 37	TAL	RCH	DAR	DOV	CLT	NSH	KEN	ROA																					90th	249	
2010	Baker-Curb Racing	27	Ford																NHA; 17	DAY	CHI; 26	GTY	IRP	IOW	GLN	MCH	BRI	CGV	ATL	RCH	DOV	KAN	CAL	CLT	GTY	TEX	PHO	HOM	90th	249	

==== Camping World Truck Series ====
NASCAR Camping World Truck Series results
Year	Team	No.	Make	1	2	3	4	5	6	7	8	9	10	11	12	13	14	15	16	17	18	19	20	21	22	23	24	25	NCWTC	Pts	Ref
2010	Red Horse Racing	7	Toyota	DAY; 18	ATL; 20	MAR; 31	NSH; 20	KAN; 13	DOV; 3	CLT; 15	TEX; 23	MCH; 18	IOW; 15	GTY; 27	IRP; 29	POC; 5	NSH; 9	DAR; 20	BRI; 5	CHI; 5	KEN; 11	NHA; 11	LVS; 8	MAR; 13	TAL; 33	TEX; 22	PHO; 9	HOM; 9	12th	2948	
2011	Germain Racing	77	Toyota	DAY; 18	PHO; 30	DAR; 13	MAR; 32	NSH; 16	DOV; 25	CLT; 13	KAN; 19	TEX; 10																	14th	687	
2011	Eddie Sharp Racing	46	Toyota										KEN; 15	IOW; 12															14th	687	
2011	Eddie Sharp Racing	6	Toyota												NSH; 15	IRP; 20	POC; 16	MCH; 15	BRI; 7	ATL; 26									14th	687	
2011	Eddie Sharp Racing	6	Chevy																		CHI; 15	NHA; 13	KEN; 11	LVS; 19	TAL; 11	MAR; 17	TEX; 10	HOM; 18	14th	687	
2012	Eddie Sharp Racing	6	Chevy	DAY; 3	MAR; 4	CAR; 10	KAN; 7	CLT; 1	DOV; 10	**TEX**; 9	KEN; 14	IOW; 5	**CHI**; 21	POC; 9	MCH; 12	BRI; 10	ATL; 14	IOW; 31	KEN; 7	LVS; 20	TAL; 24	MAR; 19	TEX; 22	PHO; 10	HOM; 9				8th	710	
2013	Eddie Sharp Racing	6	Chevy	DAY; 4	MAR	CAR	KAN	CLT; 10	DOV	TEX	KEN	IOW	ELD	POC	MCH														27th	250	
2013	Sharp Gallaher Racing	6	Chevy													BRI; 14	MSP	IOW; 19	CHI; 15	LVS; 18	TAL; 20	MAR	TEX; 5	PHO	HOM				27th	250	
2014	NTS Motorsports	9	Chevy	DAY	MAR	KAN	CLT; 10	DOV																					33rd	135	
2014	NTS Motorsports	20	Chevy						**TEX**; 2	GTW	KEN	IOW; 20	ELD	POC; 9	MCH	BRI	MSP	CHI	NHA	LVS	TAL	MAR	TEX	PHO	HOM				33rd	135	

=== ARCA Menards Series ===
(key) (Bold – Pole position awarded by qualifying time. Italics – Pole position earned by points standings or practice time. * – Most laps led.)

ARCA Menards Series results
Year	Team	No.	Make	1	2	3	4	5	6	7	8	9	10	11	12	13	14	15	16	17	18	19	20	21	AMSC	Pts	Ref
2008	Eddie Sharp Racing	93	Dodge	DAY	SLM; 19	IOW; 36	KAN; 12																		13th	3975	
2008	Eddie Sharp Racing	20	Dodge					CAR; 43	KEN; 23	TOL; 14	POC; 19	MCH; 1	**CAY**; 27	KEN; 10	BLN; 4	POC; 11	NSH; 5	ISF; 24	DSF; 12	CHI; 8	SLM; 12			**TOL**; 12*	13th	3975	
2008	Eddie Sharp Racing	20	Toyota																			NJE; 36	TAL; 16		13th	3975	
2009	Eddie Sharp Racing	6	Toyota	**DAY**; 3*	**SLM**; 2*	CAR; 22	TAL; 1*	KEN; 2*	TOL; 2*	**POC**; 2*	**MCH**; 30*	**MFD**; 4*	IOW; 10	KEN; 3	**BLN**; 1*	**POC**; 1*	**ISF**; 6*	CHI; 1*	TOL; 1*	DSF; 6	NJE; 6	SLM; 1*	**KAN**; 2	CAR; 3	1st	5715	

==== ARCA Menards Series West ====
ARCA Menards Series West results
Year	Team	No.	Make	1	2	3	4	5	6	7	8	9	10	11	12	13	AMSWC	Pts	Ref
2005	Justin Lofton	66	Chevy	PHO	MMR	PHO	S99	IRW	EVG	S99	PPR	CAL	DCS	CTS	MMR; 16		52nd	115	
2006	Justin Lofton	66	Chevy	PHO; 12	PHO; 22		IRW; 14	SON; 4	DCS; 9	IRW; 7	EVG; 10	S99; 9	CAL; 24	CTS; 13	AMP; 21		11th	1500	
2006	Nancy Myers	44	Chevy			S99; 13											11th	1500	
2007	Justin Lofton	66	Ford	CTS; 19	PHO; 24	AMP; 7	ELK; 2	IOW; 4	CNS; 12	SON; 5	DCS; 18	IRW; 12	MMP; 19	EVG; 5	CSR; 9	AMP; 12	6th	1742	
2020	Rette Jones Racing	30	Ford	LVS	MMP	MMP	IRW	EVG	DCS	CNS	LVS	AAS	KCR	PHO; 6			22nd	88	

^{*} Season still in progress

=== Stadium Super Trucks ===
(key) (Bold – Pole position. Italics – Fastest qualifier. * – Most laps led.)

Stadium Super Trucks results
Year	1	2	3	4	5	6	7	8	9	10	11	12	13	14	15	16	SSTC	Pts	Ref
2013	PHO; 11	LBH; 1	LAN; 9	SDG; 9	SDG; 9	STL; 6	TOR; 1*	TOR; 5	CRA; 6	CRA; 9	OCF; 5	OCF; 1*	OCF; 2	CPL			3rd	295	
2014	STP; 3	STP; 4	LBH	IMS	IMS	DET	DET	DET	AUS; 12	TOR	TOR	OCF	OCF	CSS	MGM; 8^{†}	MGM	16th	68	
^{†} – Replaced Bill Hynes, points went to Hynes

^{*} Season still in progress
^{1} Ineligible for series points

Sporting positions
Preceded by Justin Allgaier	ARCA Re/MAX Series Champion; 2009	Succeeded by Patrick Sheltra
