= Mike Skeen =

American racing driver (born 1986)

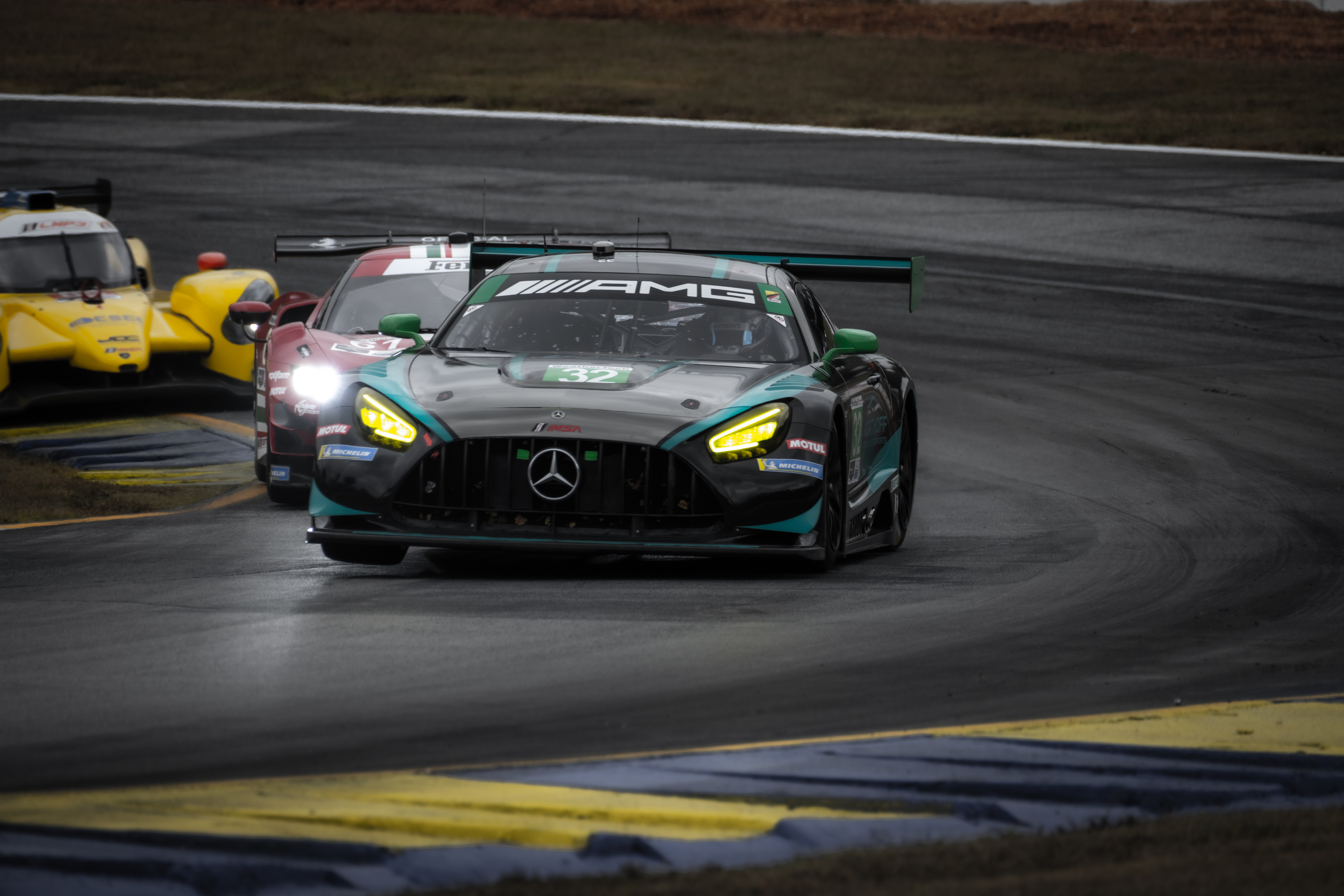
- Skeen in 2023
- Nationality: (United States) American
- Born: Michael Brian Skeen; October 25, 1986 (age 40) Durham, North Carolina, U.S.
- Categorisation: FIA Silver

NASCAR O'Reilly Auto Parts Series career
- 2 races run over 2 years
- 2024 position: 71st
- Best finish: 71st (2024)
- First race: 2018 Zippo 200 at The Glen (Watkins Glen)
- Last race: 2024 Mission 200 at The Glen (Watkins Glen)
Wins	Top tens	Poles
0	0	0

NASCAR FedEx Freight Truck Series career
- 2 races run over 2 years
- 2020 position: 72nd
- Best finish: 57th (2013)
- First race: 2013 Chevrolet Silverado 250 (Mosport)
- Last race: 2020 Sunoco 159 (Daytona RC)
Wins	Top tens	Poles
0	0	0
- Statistics up to date as of February 25, 2026.

Michael Brian Skeen (born October 25, 1986) is an American professional sports car racing driver. He competes in the IMSA SportsCar Championship driving the No. 021 Triarsi Competizione Ferrari 296 GT3.

Skeen has raced in the Pirelli World Challenge, Rolex Sports Car Series, Continental Tire Sports Car Challenge, WeatherTech SportsCar Championship, and the FIA World Endurance Championship. He has also raced in the NASCAR Xfinity Series and NASCAR Gander RV & Outdoors Truck Series as a road course ringer.

== Racing career ==
=== Sports car racing ===
Skeen, along with Scott Heckert, were the drivers of Lone Star Racing's No. 80 Mercedes-AMG GT3 in 2018. They finished sixth in the 2018 standings, with two poles and one win during the season.

In 2020, Skeen joined the Trans-Am Series' TA2 class for Stevens-Miller Racing, and won the season opener at Sebring International Raceway.

=== NASCAR ===
Skeen ran one race in 2012 in the NASCAR K&N Pro Series West, driving the No. 31 Chevrolet at Utah. He finished 17th after starting fifth.

In 2013, Skeen debuted in the Truck Series, driving the No. 6 Chevrolet Silverado for Sharp Gallaher Racing in the Chevrolet Silverado 250 at Canadian Tire Motorsports Park. He finished thirteenth after starting third due to a wreck in the final turn with Max Papis. The race ended controversially for Skeen as his girlfriend, Kelly Heaphy, slapped Papis after the race, allegedly dislocating his jaw. Heaphy was fined and suspended indefinitely, while Skeen's crew chief was also fined.

In 2018, Skeen made his Xfinity debut driving the No. 15 Chevrolet Camaro for JD Motorsports. He finished 28th, six laps down, after starting 24th.

Skeen returned to the Truck Series in August 2020, joining NEMCO Motorsports for the Sunoco 159 at the Daytona International Speedway road course.

== Motorsports career results ==
=== NASCAR ===
(key) (Bold – Pole position awarded by qualifying time. Italics – Pole position earned by points standings or practice time. * – Most laps led.)

==== Xfinity Series ====
NASCAR Xfinity Series results
Year	Team	No.	Make	1	2	3	4	5	6	7	8	9	10	11	12	13	14	15	16	17	18	19	20	21	22	23	24	25	26	27	28	29	30	31	32	33	NXSC	Pts	Ref
2018	JD Motorsports	15	Chevy	DAY	ATL	LVS	PHO	CAL	TEX	BRI	RCH	TAL	DOV	CLT	POC	MCH	IOW	CHI	DAY	KEN	NHA	IOW	GLN; 28	MOH	BRI	ROA	DAR	IND	LVS	RCH	CLT	DOV	KAN	TEX	PHO	HOM	72nd	9	
2021	JD Motorsports	15	Chevy	DAY	DAY	HOM	LVS	PHO	ATL	MAR	TAL	DAR	DOV	COA	CLT	MOH	TEX	NSH	POC	ROA	ATL	NHA	GLN	IND; DNQ	MCH	DAY	DAR	RCH	BRI	LVS	TAL	CLT	TEX	KAN	MAR	PHO	107th	-	
2024	Jordan Anderson Racing	87	Chevy	DAY	ATL	LVS	PHO	COA	RCH	MAR	TEX	TAL	DOV	DAR	CLT	PIR	SON	IOW	NHA	NSH	CSC	POC	IND	MCH	DAY	DAR	ATL	GLN; 30	BRI	KAN	TAL	ROV	LVS	HOM	MAR	PHO	71st	7	

==== Gander RV & Outdoors Truck Series ====
NASCAR Gander RV & Outdoors Truck Series results
Year	Team	No.	Make	1	2	3	4	5	6	7	8	9	10	11	12	13	14	15	16	17	18	19	20	21	22	23	NGTC	Pts	Ref
2013	Sharp Gallaher Racing	6	Chevy	DAY	MAR	CAR	KAN	CLT	DOV	TEX	KEN	IOW	ELD	POC	MCH	BRI	MSP; 13	IOW	CHI	LVS	TAL	MAR	TEX	PHO	HOM		57th	31	
2020	NEMCO Motorsports	8	Chevy	DAY	LVS	CLT	ATL	HOM	POC	KEN	TEX	KAN	KAN	MCH	DAY; 23	DOV	GTW	DAR	RCH	BRI	LVS	TAL	KAN	TEX	MAR	PHO	72nd	14	

^{*} Season still in progress
^{1} Ineligible for series points

==== K&N Pro Series West ====
NASCAR K&N Pro Series West results
Year	Team	No.	Make	1	2	3	4	5	6	7	8	9	10	11	12	13	14	15	NKNPSWC	Pts	Ref
2012	Richard Childress Racing	31	Chevy	PHO	LHC	MMP; 17	S99	IOW	BIR	LVS	SON	EVG	CNS	IOW	PIR	SMP	AAS	PHO	71st	27	

=== Complete WeatherTech SportsCar Championship results ===
(key) (Races in bold indicate pole position; results in italics indicate fastest lap)

Year	Team	Class	Make	Engine	1	2	3	4	5	6	7	8	9	10	11	12	Pos.	Points
2014	Park Place Motorsports	GTD	Porsche 911 GT America	Porsche 4.0 L Flat-6	DAY	SEB	LGA	DET	WGL	MOS	IMS; 10	ELK	VIR	COA	PET; 13		41st	56
2015	GB Autosport	GTD	Porsche 911 GT America	Porsche 4.0 L Flat-6	DAY; 7	SEB; 13†	LGA	BEL	WGL	LIM	ELK	VIR	AUS	PET			43rd	26
2016	Lone Star Racing	GTD	Dodge Viper GT3-R	Dodge 8.3 L V10	DAY	SEB	LGA; 14	BEL	WGL	MOS	LIM	ELK; 10	VIR; 9	AUS; 8			19th	88
2016	Stevenson Motorsports	GTD	Audi R8 LMS	Audi 5.2 L V10											PET; 7†		19th	88
2017	Lone Star Racing	GTD	Mercedes-AMG GT3	Mercedes-AMG M159 6.2 L V8	DAY	SEB	LBH	AUS; 12	BEL	WGL	MOS	LIM	ELK; DNS	VIR; 11	LGA; 15	PET	42nd	55
2019	Starworks Motorsport	GTD	Audi R8 LMS Evo	Audi 5.2 L V10	DAY	SEB	MDO	DET	WGL; 12	MOS	LIM	ELK	VIR	LGA	PET		60th	19
2021	Alegra Motorsports	GTD	Mercedes-AMG GT3 Evo	Mercedes-AMG M159 6.2 L V8	DAY; 9	SEB	MDO	DET	WGL	WGL	LIM		LGA	LBH			35th	644
2021	Team Korthoff Motorsports	GTD	Mercedes-AMG GT3 Evo	Mercedes-AMG M159 6.2 L V8											VIR; 11	PET; 14	35th	644
2021	Jr III Motorsports	LMP3	Ligier JS P320	Nissan VK56DE 5.6L V8								ELK; 7					31st	265
2022	Team Korthoff Motorsports	GTD	Mercedes-AMG GT3 Evo	Mercedes-AMG M159 6.2 L V8	DAY; 3	SEB; 2	LBH; 6	LGA	MDO; 6	DET; 5	**WGL**; 10	MOS	LIM; 4	ELK; 8	VIR; 8	PET; 6	9th	2577
2023	Team Korthoff Motorsports	GTD	Mercedes-AMG GT3 Evo	Mercedes-AMG M159 6.2 L V8	DAY; 15	SEB; 10	LBH; 4	MON; 15	WGL; 12	MOS; 3	**LIM**; 10	ELK; 3	VIR; 11	IMS; 9	PET; 6		7th	2773
2024	Korthoff/Preston Motorsports	GTD	Mercedes-AMG GT3 Evo	Mercedes-AMG M159 6.2 L V8	DAY; 5	SEB; 21	LBH; 3	LGA; 4	WGL; 11	MOS; 8	ELK	VIR	**IMS**; 3	PET; 19			17th	2004
2025	Triarsi Competizione	GTD	Ferrari 296 GT3	Ferrari F163CE 3.0 L Turbo V6	DAY; 22	SEB; 15	LBH	LGA	WGL	MOS	ELK	VIR	IMS				47th	464
2025	Conquest Racing	GTD	Ferrari 296 GT3	Ferrari F163CE 3.0 L Turbo V6										PET; 16			47th	464

^{†} Skeen did not complete sufficient laps in order to score full points.
