= Eddie Sharp =

American stock car racing team owner, crew chief, driver and powerboat racer

- Born: August 12, 1964 (age 62); Clearwater, Florida, U.S.
- Achievements: 1999 ARCA Racing Series champion crew chief

NASCAR O'Reilly Auto Parts Series career
- 2 races run over 1 year
- Best finish: 68th (1993)
- First race: 1993 Goodwrench 200 (Rockingham)
- Last race: 1993 Food City 250 (Bristol)
Wins	Top tens	Poles
0	0	0

Eddie Sharp Jr. (born August 12, 1964) is an American stock car racing team owner and former driver who formerly competed in the USAR Hooters Pro Cup Series and the NASCAR Busch Series. He is a former co-owner of Sharp Gallaher Racing, which competed in the NASCAR Camping World Truck Series and the ARCA Racing Series.

== Racing career ==
Born in Clearwater, Florida in 1964, Sharp began his racing career as a powerboat racer, competing in hydroplanes along with his father, Eddie Sharp Sr., during the 1980s.

Moving to automobile racing as a result of safety concerns, Sharp competed in local stock car races, moving up to the NASCAR Busch Series in 1993, competing two events with a best finish of fourteenth at Bristol International Raceway. He then moved to compete in the American Speed Association's national tour, competing with only moderate success for several years, both as a driver and as a crew chief.

Sharp's career as a crew chief saw success in the ARCA Racing Series, where he was the 1999 champion crew chief with driver Bill Baird. He also served as a crew chief in the Sprint Cup Series for a number of races in the late 1990s with BAM Racing and drivers Shawna Robinson and Hermie Sadler.

== Team owner ==
Sharp's initial foray into team ownership was in 1999 in the ARCA Re/MAX Series; the effort proved unsuccessful and soon closed, however after some time away from the sport Sharp returned, founding Eddie Sharp Racing in 2005; competing in the ARCA Re/MAX Series, the team scored its first win at Kentucky Speedway in July 2007 with driver Michael McDowell. The team won the 2009 ARCA championship with Justin Lofton.

After a failed attempt to break into the NASCAR ranks with Woodard & Sharp Racing and driver Boston Reid in 2006, ESR began competing in the NASCAR Camping World Truck Series in 2010, and scored its first win in the series with Justin Lofton at Charlotte Motor Speedway in May 2012.

== Motorsports career results ==
=== NASCAR ===
==== Busch Series ====
! !

==== Craftsman Truck Series ====
!
