= Martin Roy =

Canadian racing driver (born 1974)

- Born: February 1, 1974 (age 52); Napierville, Quebec, Canada

NASCAR O'Reilly Auto Parts Series career
- 24 races run over 4 years
- 2017 position: 55th
- Best finish: 35th (2016)
- First race: 2014 Blue Jeans Go Green 200 (Phoenix)
- Last race: 2017 Overton's 200 (Loudon)
Wins	Top tens	Poles
0	0	0

NASCAR FedEx Freight Truck Series career
- 1 race run over 1 year
- 2013 position: 98th
- Best finish: 98th (2013)
- First race: 2013 Chevrolet Silverado 250 (Mosport)
Wins	Top tens	Poles
0	0	0

NASCAR Canada Series career
- 28 races run over 3 years
- Best finish: 4th (2013)
- First race: 2011 Grand Prix ICAR (Circuit ICAR)
- Last race: 2013 Pinty's 250 (Kawartha)
Wins	Top tens	Poles
0	15	0

Previous series
- 1990-2012 Car No. Championships Wins: Modified racing 90; 2; 53

Awards
- 2012 NASCAR Canada Series Rookie of the Year
- Statistics up to date as of July 15, 2017.

Martin Roy (born February 1, 1974) is a Canadian former professional stock car racing driver. He spent two seasons full-time in the NASCAR Canadian Tire Series. He also made starts in the NASCAR Xfinity Series, NASCAR Camping World Truck Series, and NASCAR K&N Pro Series East.

== Racing career ==
=== Early career ===
Martin Roy was introduced to karting by his father, Normand, at just 12 years old, and went on to capture the Canadian Karting Championship. By 16, he transitioned into DIRTcar Sportsman Modified competition at Autodrome Granby and Autodrome Drummond in Quebec, later expanding his experience in 1993 by competing in the ACT Series on asphalt. In 2001, he advanced to Small Block Modified competition including appearances at Cornwall Motor Speedway in Ontario.

=== K&N Pro Series East ===
Roy made one start in the NASCAR K&N Pro Series East, the season-opening 2013 race at Bristol Motor Speedway, where he started 31st and finished 22nd, a lap down.

=== Canadian Tire Series ===
Roy debuted in 2011, running four races. Running Dodges, he crashed out of his first attempt at Circuit ICAR but did not crash again that season. He recorded a best finish of 13th at Circuit de Trois-Rivieres. Roy jumped to the full schedule in 2012, qualifying for all twelve races, getting his first top-ten, his first top-five, and finishing eighth in the point standings. He also won Rookie of the Year in that series. In 2013, Roy set new personal highs in top-fives (four), top-tens (nine) and finished fourth in the point standings for the twelve race season. He continued running King Autosport's Canada branch after getting out of the drivers seat.

=== Camping World Truck Series ===
Roy debuted in the NASCAR Camping World Truck Series with King Autosport, owned by fellow Canadian Mario Gosselin. The race was run at Canadian Tire Motorsport Park, a road course visited in the Canadian Tire Series. Roy qualified 21st and finished 14th.

=== Xfinity Series ===
Roy first attempted an Xfinity race in 2013, failing to qualify at Bristol Motor Speedway for King Autosport. In 2014, Roy ran five races with King, falling out of three races with engine problems and posting a best finish of 30th in his debut race at Phoenix International Raceway. For 2015, he piloted the No. 90 in seven races, posting a best finish of 15th in the Subway Firecracker 250 at Daytona International Speedway. In 2016, Roy returned in a limited capacity, driving two of the first ten races. He continued to run a partial schedule for King Autosport with sponsorship from Gamache Truck Centers. His runs were mostly mid-20s to high-30s. In 2017, Roy made his name known at Las Vegas Motor Speedway when he missed a sliding Dakoda Armstrong by only inches at full speed.

== Personal life ==
Roy was injured skiing before the 2015 racing season, which derailed plans for Roy and forced King Autosport to put Dexter Bean in to rides where Roy would have potentially driven. His son Felix, at age of 14, became the youngest DIRTcar driver to win a feature race in Canada’s history in 2019, and captured its 358 Modified touring series championship in 2024.

== Motorsports career results ==
=== NASCAR ===
(key) (Bold – Pole position awarded by qualifying time. Italics – Pole position earned by points standings or practice time. * – Most laps led.)

==== Xfinity Series ====
NASCAR Xfinity Series results
Year	Team	No.	Make	1	2	3	4	5	6	7	8	9	10	11	12	13	14	15	16	17	18	19	20	21	22	23	24	25	26	27	28	29	30	31	32	33	NXSC	Pts	Ref
2013	DGM Racing	90	Chevy	DAY	PHO	LVS	BRI	CAL	TEX	RCH	TAL	DAR	CLT	DOV	IOW	MCH	ROA	KEN	DAY	NHA	CHI	IND	IOW	GLN	MOH	BRI; DNQ	ATL	RCH	CHI	KEN	DOV	KAN	CLT	TEX	PHO	HOM	NA	-	
2014	DGM Racing	90	Chevy	DAY	PHO; 30	LVS	BRI	CAL	TEX	DAR	RCH	TAL	IOW	CLT	DOV	MCH	ROA	KEN; 31	DAY	NHA	CHI	IND	IOW	GLN	MOH	BRI	ATL	RCH	CHI; 38	KEN	DOV	KAN; 33	CLT	TEX; 35	PHO	HOM; DNQ	49th	53	
2015	King Autosport	90	Chevy	DAY	ATL	LVS	PHO	CAL	TEX	BRI	RCH	TAL	IOW	CLT	DOV	MCH; 28	CHI; 30	DAY; 21	KEN	NHA	IND; 24	IOW	GLN	MOH	BRI	ROA	DAR	RCH	CHI; 29	KEN; 22	DOV	CLT	KAN	TEX; 29	PHO	HOM	37th	125	
2016	King Autosport	90	Chevy	DAY; 38	ATL	LVS	PHO	CAL	TEX; 25	BRI	RCH	TAL	DOV	CLT; 26	POC	MCH; 27	IOW	DAY	KEN	NHA	IND	IOW	GLN	MOH	BRI	ROA	DAR	RCH	CHI; 22	KEN	DOV	CLT; 31	KAN; 26	TEX; 30	PHO	HOM	35th	102	
2017	King Autosport	90	Chevy	DAY	ATL	LVS; 32	PHO	CAL; 25	TEX	BRI	RCH	TAL; 32	CLT	DOV	POC	MCH	IOW	DAY	KEN	NHA; 33	IND	IOW	GLN	MOH	BRI	ROA	DAR	RCH	CHI	KEN	DOV	CLT	KAN	TEX	PHO	HOM	55th	26	

==== Camping World Truck Series ====
NASCAR Camping World Truck Series results
Year	Team	No.	Make	1	2	3	4	5	6	7	8	9	10	11	12	13	14	15	16	17	18	19	20	21	22	NCWTC	Pts	Ref
2013	DGM Racing	84	Chevy	DAY	MAR	CAR	KAN	CLT	DOV	TEX	KEN	IOW	ELD	POC	MCH	BRI	MSP; 14	IOW	CHI	LVS	TAL	MAR	TEX	PHO	HOM	98th	0^{1}	

==== K&N Pro Series East ====
NASCAR K&N Pro Series East results
Year	Team	No.	Make	1	2	3	4	5	6	7	8	9	10	11	12	13	14	NKNPSEC	Pts	Ref
2013	DGM Racing	90	Chevy	BRI; 22	GRE	FIF	RCH	BGS	IOW	LGY	COL	IOW	VIR	GRE	NHA	DOV	RAL	67th	22	

==== Canadian Tire Series ====
NASCAR Canadian Tire Series results
Year	Team	No.	Make	1	2	3	4	5	6	7	8	9	10	11	12	NCTSC	Pts	Ref
2011	DGM Racing	90	Dodge	MSP	ICAR; 26	DEL	MSP; 14	TOR	MPS	SAS	CTR; 13	CGV; 21	BAR	RIS	KWA	30th	430	
2012	DGM Racing	90	Dodge	MSP; 18	ICAR; 10	MSP; 19	DEL; 12	MPS; 6	EDM; 5	SAS; 10	CTR; 24	CGV; 12	BAR; 18	RIS; 8	KWA; 5	8th	383	
2013	DGM Racing	90	Dodge	MSP; 20	DEL; 5	MSP; 6	ICAR; 9	MPS; 11	SAS; 20	ASE; 7	CTR; 6	RIS; 5	MSP; 2	BAR; 6	KWA; 5	4th	429	

^{*} Season still in progress
^{1} Ineligible for series points
