= Black's Tire 200 =

The Black's Tire 200 may refer to:

- NASCAR Craftsman Truck Series at Rockingham Speedway
- NASCAR Craftsman Truck Series at Martinsville Speedway
