= Sharp Gallaher Racing =

Former NASCAR team

- Owner(s): Eddie Sharp; Bill Gallaher
- Base: Mooresville, North Carolina
- Series: Camping World Truck Series
- Race drivers: 6. Justin Lofton/Danny Efland; 8. Max Gresham
- Manufacturer: Chevrolet
- Opened: 2005
- Closed: 2013

Career
- Debut: 2010 Mountain Dew 250
- Latest race: 2013 Ford EcoBoost 200
- Races competed: 118
- Drivers' Championships: 0
- Race victories: 2
- Pole positions: 1

Sharp Gallaher Racing (formerly known as Eddie Sharp Racing) is a disbanded NASCAR team based in Mooresville, North Carolina that competed in the ARCA Racing Series and the NASCAR Camping World Truck Series. The team fielded the No. 6 Chevrolet Silverado for Justin Lofton and various other drivers and the No. 8 Chevrolet for Max Gresham.

== History ==
=== ARCA ===
The team was formed by former driver and crew chief Eddie Sharp in 2005, who had formerly fielded his own ASA team and was the crew chief for Bill Baird during his championship-winning 1999 ARCA season. The team made its debut in 2006 with former Grand-Am driver Michael McDowell running a limited schedule. McDowell and Sharp ran full-time in 2007, running the No. 2 Make-A-Wish Foundation Dodge. McDowell grabbed four wins in his rookie season but finished second in the championship to Frank Kimmel. ESR also fielded the No. 22 Dodge, with Josh Wise and Ken Butler III sharing the ride, with Butler winning at Toledo Speedway. With McDowell moving on to Michael Waltrip Racing, Sharp expanded to three teams and switched to running Toyotas, hiring former Scuderia Toro Rosso Formula 1 driver Scott Speed to drive the No. 2, while retaining Butler for the full season and fielding a third car (No. 93) in a number of races for Canadian NASCAR driver Pierre Bourque. The team soon changed numbers to the No. 20 with Justin Lofton for the rest of the year. ESR dominated the season, with Speed winning four races en route to a second-place finish in the championship and Lofton won at Michigan.

With Speed heading to the Sprint Cup Series, ESR gained a reputation of fielding championship-caliber drivers. In 2009, Lofton stayed on with ESR for the full season as the team expanded to a fourth car, the No. 81 for Camping World Series East driver Craig Goess. The No. 2 would be driven by another Grand-Am driver, Tim George Jr., and the No. 20 would be driven by Canadian Steve Arpin on a part-time basis. Lofton won ESR's first ever championship that season, grabbing an impressive four wins, while Goess and Arpin impressed many. Like his predecessors, Lofton moved to Red Horse Racing to run for the Camping World Truck Series title in 2010, while Goess returned for the full season. ESR ran only Goess' 81 for the full season, while continuing to field the 6 for a bevy of drivers, including another former F1 driver, Nelson Piquet Jr., Blake Koch, Brandon McReynolds (son of Fox broadcaster Larry McReynolds), and others. Goess had a solid season, winning only once at Pocono but finishing second in points to Patrick Sheltra.

=== NASCAR Truck Series ===
==== 2006: Woodard & Sharp Racing ====
ESR made its first foray into NASCAR in 2006, when he partnered with co-owner Rick Woodard to field a full-time Truck Series team that year with former Hendrick Motorsports development driver Boston Reid running full-time in the No. 25. Woodard did not join Sharp's existing ARCA team as a co-owner, and their Truck team was operated separately from it. After the first four races of the season, Sharp left WSR, leaving Woodard as the team's only owner. Reid would be replaced by ARCA driver Damon Lusk as the team's driver with five races to go in the season. Although the team supposedly was preparing to return for at least the Daytona season-opener, Woodard Racing closed down before the start of the 2007 season.

==== Truck No. 25 results ====
Year	Driver	No.	Make	1	2	3	4	5	6	7	8	9	10	11	12	13	14	15	16	17	18	19	20	21	22	23	24	25	Owners	Pts
2006	Boston Reid	25	Dodge	DAY; 36	CAL; 34	ATL; 24	MAR; 31	GTY; 16	CLT; 16	MFD; 14	DOV; 33	TEX; 17	MCH; 17	MLW; 26	KAN; 28	KEN; 14	MEM; 24	IRP; 24	NSH; 14	BRI; 28	NHA; 33	LVS; 33	TAL; 29						27th	2262
2006	Damon Lusk	25	Dodge																					MAR; 36	ATL; 17	TEX; 18	PHO; 26	HOM; 18	27th	2262

==== 2010: Sharp-Hartman Racing ====
Sharp would not be an owner in the Truck Series again until 2010, where he returned to the series with another co-owner, Carl Hartman, to field a No. 41 Toyota Tundra for Steve Park in two events.

==== Truck No. 41 results ====
Year	Driver	No.	Make	1	2	3	4	5	6	7	8	9	10	11	12	13	14	15	16	17	18	19	20	21	22	23	24	25	Owners	Pts
2010	Steve Park	41	Toyota	DAY	ATL	MAR	NSH	KAN	DOV	CLT	TEX	MCH	IOW	GTY	IRP	POC	NSH	DAR	BRI	CHI; 18	KEN; 25	NHA	LVS	MAR	TAL	TEX	PHO	HOM	55th	197

==== 2010–2013: Eddie Sharp Racing ====
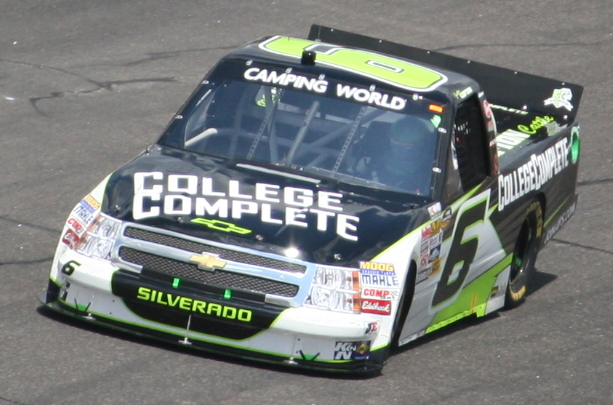
Justin Lofton in the No. 6 at Rockingham Speedway in 2012

Late in the season, ESR had purchased the assets of Team Gill Racing No. 46 and had intended to run Craig Goess for Rookie of the Year in 2011. After only 9 races, Goess was released from the team and Sharp was reunited with Lofton, who had sponsorship from CollegeComplete.com and a new crew chief in Daniel Bormann.

For 2012, Eddie Sharp purchased the spun-off assets of Kevin Harvick Incorporated that were not acquired in the race team's merger with Richard Childress Racing, specifically the 8 and 33 trucks driven by Piquet and Ron Hornaday. Cale Gale drove the 33 in 2012 with sponsorship from Rheem, and a technical alliance with Childress. The 8 truck was driven by Mike Skinner at Daytona, but he wrecked early alongside Gale. In Martinsville, Eddie Sharp sold the No. 8 Truck's owners points to Jennifer Jo Cobb, who swapped manufacturers and numbers (Cobb had the No. 8 as a Dodge, while Chris Lafferty drove the No. 10 Chevrolet). Sharp then gave the owners points to Cobb for the rest of 2012 in order to allow the truck to eventually be used part-time if a third driver was necessary. On May 18, 2012, Justin Lofton won his first race in the No. 6 truck. Gale would win the season finale at Homestead in a photo finish.

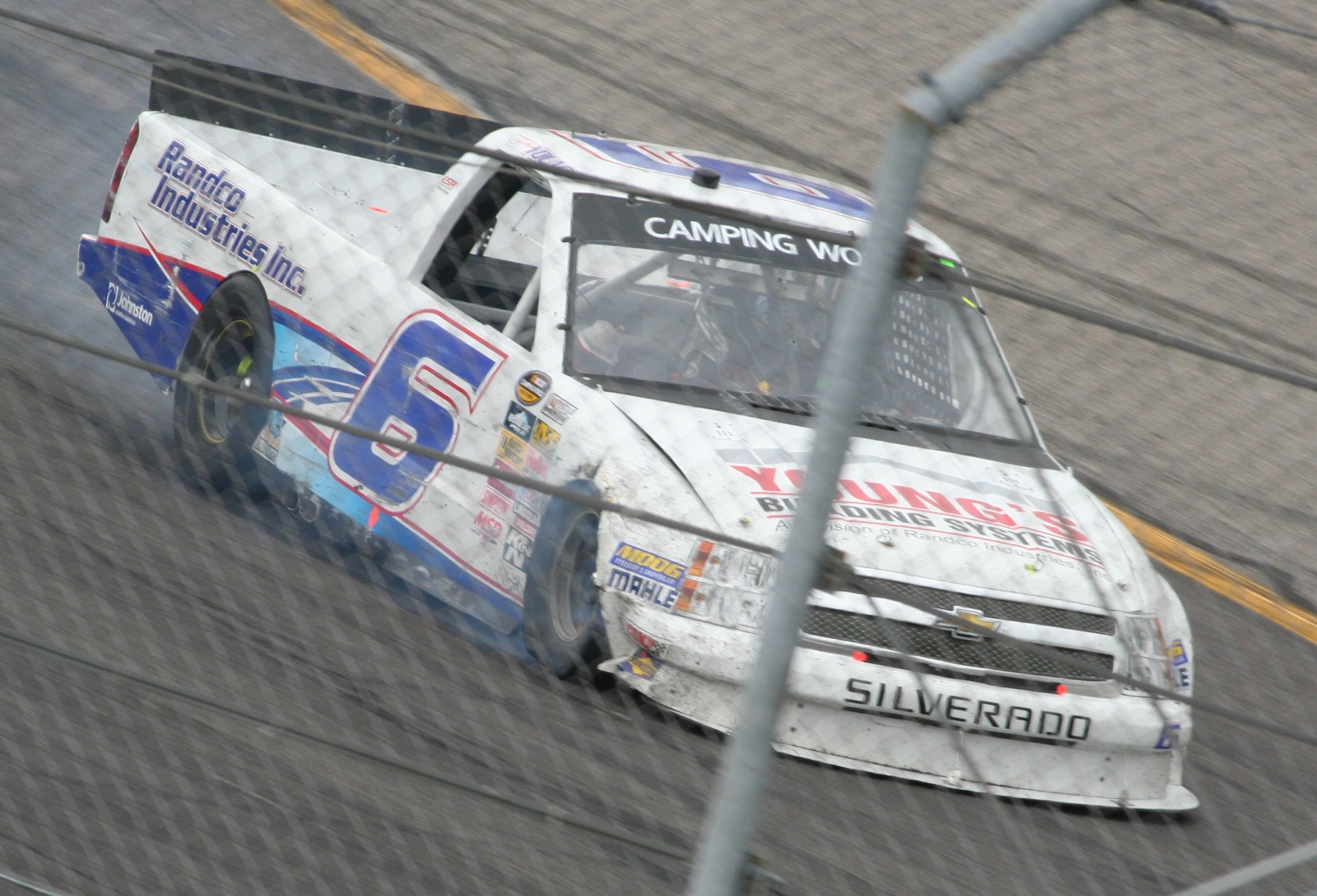
The team's No. 6 truck in a partnership with Young's Motorsports, driven by Tyler Young, at Rockingham Speedway in 2013

For 2013, Lofton would reduce his schedule to only a few races, while Gale and Rheem departed for Turner Scott Motorsports. Max Gresham would run the full schedule for the team, with Truck Series veteran crew chief Gary Showalter.

==== 2013: Sharp Gallaher Racing ====
In August of that year, Eddie Sharp announced a partnership with California businessman Bill Gallaher, changing the team name to Sharp Gallaher Racing. Soon after this, it was also announced that the team would relocate from Denver, North Carolina to the stock car racing hotbed of Mooresville, North Carolina. On December 17, 2013, reports arose that the team had shut down with immediate effect until later in the day when it was confirmed that the team had shut down with the remaining staff being laid off.

==== Truck No. 6 results ====
Year	Driver	No.	Make	1	2	3	4	5	6	7	8	9	10	11	12	13	14	15	16	17	18	19	20	21	22	23	24	25	Owners	Pts
2010	Craig Goess	46	Toyota	DAY	ATL	MAR	NSH	KAN	DOV	CLT	TEX	MCH	IOW	GTW	IRP	POC	NSH	DAR	BRI	CHI	KEN	NHA	LVS	MAR	TAL; 10			HOM; 12	21st	2445
2010	Jason Bowles	46	Toyota																							TEX; 28			21st	2445
2010	Steve Park	46	Toyota																								PHO; 19		21st	2445
2011	Craig Goess	46	Toyota	DAY; 16	PHO; 23	DAR; 19	MAR; 24	NSH; 9	DOV; 24	CLT; 22	KAN; 23	TEX; 18																	16th	684
2011	Justin Lofton	46	Toyota										KEN; 15	IOW; 12															16th	684
2011	Justin Lofton	6	Toyota												NSH; 15	IRP; 20	POC; 16	MCH; 15	BRI; 7	ATL; 26									16th	684
2011	Justin Lofton	6	Chevy																		CHI; 15	NHA; 13	KEN; 11	LVS; 19	TAL; 11	MAR; 17	TEX; 10	HOM; 18	16th	684
2012	Justin Lofton	6	Chevy	DAY; 3	MAR; 4	CAR; 10	KAN; 7	CLT; 1	DOV; 10	TEX; 9	KEN; 14	IOW; 5	CHI; 21	POC; 9	MCH; 12	BRI; 10	ATL; 14	IOW; 31	KEN; 7	LVS; 20	TAL; 24	MAR; 19	TEX; 22	PHO; 10	HOM; 9				9th	710
2013	Justin Lofton	6	Chevy	DAY; 4	MAR	CAR	KAN	CLT; 10	DOV	TEX	KEN	IOW				BRI; 14		IOW; 19	CHI; 15	LVS; 18	TAL; 20		TEX; 5						22nd	437
2013	Jared Landers	6	Chevy										ELD; 12	POC	MCH														22nd	437
2013	Mike Skeen	6	Chevy														MSP; 13												22nd	437
2013	Daniel Hemric	6	Chevy																			MAR; 32		PHO; 13					22nd	437
2013	Austin Dillon	6	Chevy																						HOM; 20				22nd	437

==== Truck No. 8 results ====
Year	Driver	No.	Make	1	2	3	4	5	6	7	8	9	10	11	12	13	14	15	16	17	18	19	20	21	22	Owners	Pts
2012	Mike Skinner	8	Chevy	DAY; 33	MAR	CAR	KAN	CLT	DOV	TEX	KEN	IOW	CHI	POC	MCH	BRI										37th	150
2012	Max Gresham	8	Chevy														ATL; 22	IOW	KEN; 23	LVS	TAL	MAR; 11	TEX; 12	PHO	HOM; 23	37th	150
2013	Max Gresham	8	Chevy	DAY; 24	MAR; 30	CAR; 16	KAN; 25	CLT; 3	DOV; 28	TEX; 22	KEN; 31	IOW; 15	ELD; 10	POC; 13	MCH; 18	BRI; 15	MSP; 24	IOW; 13	CHI; 19	LVS; 10	TAL; 8	MAR; 11	TEX; 18	PHO; 15	HOM; 22	18th	579

==== Truck No. 33 results ====
Year	Driver	No.	Make	1	2	3	4	5	6	7	8	9	10	11	12	13	14	15	16	17	18	19	20	21	22	Owners	Pts
2012	Cale Gale	33	Chevy	DAY; 32	MAR; 15	CAR; 17	KAN; 11	CLT; 19	DOV; 5	TEX; 8	KEN; 25	IOW; 26	CHI; 6	POC; 14	MCH; 20	BRI; 28	ATL; 15	IOW; 5	KEN; 19	LVS; 7	TAL; 10	MAR; 35	TEX; 15	PHO; 7	HOM; 1	14th	634
2013	John King	33	Chevy	DAY; 18	MAR	CAR	KAN	CLT	DOV	TEX	KEN	IOW	ELD	POC	MCH	BRI	MSP	IOW	CHI	LVS	TAL	MAR	TEX	PHO	HOM	59th	26

==== Truck No. 45 results ====
Year	Driver	No.	Make	1	2	3	4	5	6	7	8	9	10	11	12	13	14	15	16	17	18	19	20	21	22	23	24	25	Owners	Pts
2011	Mike Skinner	45	Toyota	DAY; DNQ	PHO; 24																								62nd	20
2011	Chad McCumbee	45	Toyota			DAR; DNQ	MAR	NSH	DOV	CLT	KAN	TEX	KEN	IOW	NSH	IRP	POC	MCH	BRI	ATL	CHI	NHA	KEN	LVS	TAL	MAR	TEX		62nd	20
2011	Tim George Jr.	45	Chevy																									HOM; DNQ	62nd	20
