= Carolina 200 =

Two different races were known as the Carolina 200:

- ARCA Re/MAX Carolina 200, the spring ARCA Racing Series race at Rockingham Speedway in 1973 and in 2008-09
- Good Sam Roadside Assistance Carolina 200, the spring NASCAR Camping World Truck Series race at Rockingham Speedway from 2012 to present
