= North Carolina Education Lottery 200 =

North Carolina Education Lottery 200 may refer to:

- North Carolina Education Lottery 200 (Charlotte), a NASCAR race held at Charlotte Motor Speedway starting in 2008
- North Carolina Education Lottery 200 (Rockingham), a NASCAR race held at Rockingham Speedway from 2012 to 2013
