= Rockingham 200 =

Rockingham 200 can refer to two races:

- Target House 200, former then-NASCAR Busch Series race at Rockingham Speedway
- Black's Tire 200, NASCAR Craftsman Truck Series race at Rockingham Speedway
