= Max Gresham =

American racing driver (born 1993)

- Born: April 30, 1993 (age 33); Stockbridge, Georgia, U.S.
- Achievements: 2011 K&N Pro Series East Champion

NASCAR FedEx Freight Truck Series career
- 53 races run over 4 years
- 2014 position: 32nd
- Best finish: 16th (2013)
- First race: 2011 Smith's 350 (Las Vegas)
- Last race: 2014 WinStar World Casino & Resort 350 (Texas)
| Wins | Top tens | Poles |
|---|---|---|
| 0 | 5 | 0 |
- Statistics up to date as of October 31, 2014.

Max Gresham (born April 30, 1993) is an American former professional stock car racing driver. He was the winner of the 2011 NASCAR K&N Pro Series East championship.

== Personal life and early career ==
Born in Stockbridge, Georgia in 1993, Gresham's racing career started at the age of eight. He has won track championships at Atlanta Motor Speedway and Charlotte Motor Speedway, and won the Legends Car Semi-Pro National Championship in 2006 at the age of 13. He graduated from high school in 2011.

== Racing career ==
=== K&N Pro Series East and ARCA Racing Series ===
Starting in 2009 and running through the 2011 racing season, Gresham competed in the K&N Pro Series East, a NASCAR regional touring series, driving for Joe Gibbs Racing. He won four races during his career in the K&N Pro Series East, with the first coming at South Boston Speedway in April 2010; he also won once in twelve starts in the ARCA Racing Series, at Mansfield Motorsports Park.

In 2011, Gresham won the K&N Pro Series East series championship by 63 points over Bubba Wallace Gresham's K&N Pro Series East championship was the second won by Joe Gibbs Racing, following the team's winning the 2007 series championship with Joey Logano.

=== Camping World Truck Series ===
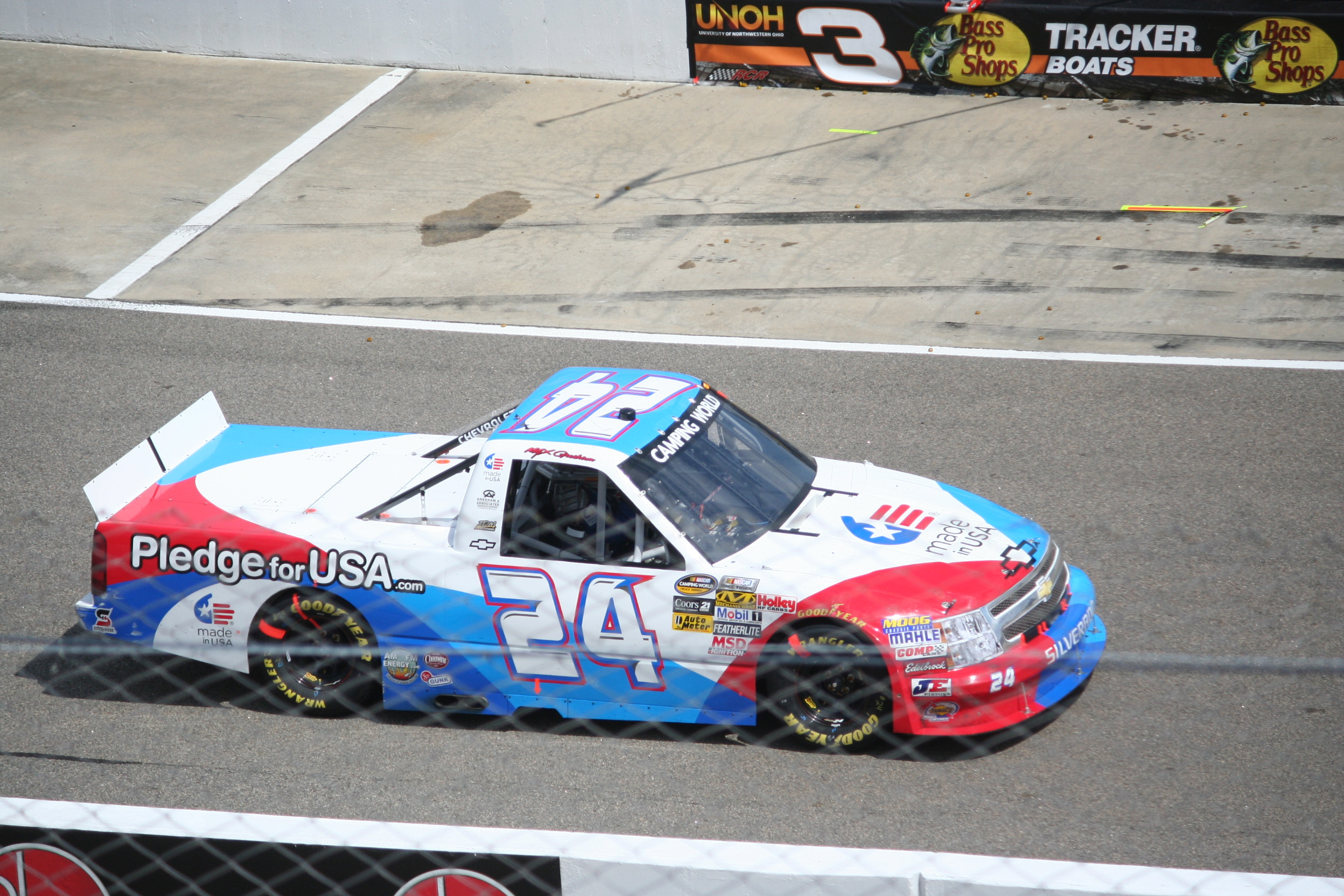
Gresham at Rockingham in 2012

Gresham made his debut in the Camping World Truck Series in 2011 at Las Vegas Motor Speedway. He made three starts late in the season in the series, finishing 54th in the final season standings, in preparation for 2012, when he will be competing for Rookie of the Year in the NASCAR Camping World Truck Series, driving the No. 24 for Joe Denette Motorsports as a teammate to four-time Truck Series champion Ron Hornaday Jr. However, Gresham's performance in the Trucks failed to live up to expectations, and he parted ways with JDM after eight races in the 2012 season. He signed with Eddie Sharp Racing to run selected races later in the year shortly thereafter; he returned to ESR for the full 2013 season. His team ESR shut down midway the season, but his ride was secured by SGR allowing him to finish the season. He finished 16th in the point standings, including a best finish of third at Charlotte.

== Motorsports career results ==
=== NASCAR ===
(key) (Bold – Pole position awarded by qualifying time. Italics – Pole position earned by points standings or practice time. * – Most laps led.)

==== Camping World Truck Series ====
NASCAR Camping World Truck Series results
| Year | Team | No. | Make | 1 | 2 | 3 | 4 | 5 | 6 | 7 | 8 | 9 | 10 | 11 | 12 | 13 | 14 | 15 | 16 | 17 | 18 | 19 | 20 | 21 | 22 | 23 | 24 | 25 | NCWTC | Pts | Ref |
|---|---|---|---|---|---|---|---|---|---|---|---|---|---|---|---|---|---|---|---|---|---|---|---|---|---|---|---|---|---|---|---|
| 2011 | Turn One Racing | 66 | Chevy | DAY | PHO | DAR | MAR | NSH | DOV | CLT | KAN | TEX | KEN | IOW | NSH | IRP | POC | MCH | BRI | ATL | CHI | NHA | KEN | LVS; 25 | TAL | MAR; 25 | TEX | HOM; 31 | 54th | 51 | |
| 2012 | Joe Denette Motorsports | 24 | Chevy | DAY; 26 | MAR; 19 | CAR; 18 | KAN; 22 | CLT; 24 | DOV; 30 | TEX; 21 | KEN; 30 | IOW | CHI | POC | MCH | BRI | | | | | | | | | | | | | 24th | 291 | |
| 2012 | Eddie Sharp Racing | 8 | Chevy | | | | | | | | | | | | | | ATL; 22 | IOW | KEN; 23 | LVS | TAL | MAR; 11 | TEX; 12 | PHO | HOM; 23 | | | | 24th | 291 | |
| 2013 | Eddie Sharp Racing | 8 | Chevy | DAY; 24 | MAR; 30 | CAR; 16 | KAN; 25 | CLT; 3 | DOV; 28 | TEX; 22 | KEN; 31 | IOW; 15 | ELD; 10 | POC; 13 | | | | | | | | | | | | | | | 16th | 579 | |
| 2013 | Sharp Gallaher Racing | 8 | Chevy | | | | | | | | | | | | MCH; 18 | BRI; 15 | MSP; 24 | IOW; 13 | CHI; 19 | LVS; 10 | TAL; 8 | MAR; 11 | TEX; 18 | PHO; 15 | HOM; 22 | | | | 16th | 579 | |
| 2014 | GMS Racing | 23 | Chevy | DAY | MAR | KAN | CLT; 31 | DOV | TEX | GTW | KEN; 11 | IOW | ELD | POC | MCH | BRI; 12 | MSP | CHI | NHA | LVS | TAL | MAR; 22 | TEX; 7 | PHO | HOM | | | | 32nd | 137 | |

==== K&N Pro Series East ====
NASCAR K&N Pro Series East results
| Year | Team | No. | Make | 1 | 2 | 3 | 4 | 5 | 6 | 7 | 8 | 9 | 10 | 11 | 12 | NKNPSEC | Pts | Ref |
|---|---|---|---|---|---|---|---|---|---|---|---|---|---|---|---|---|---|---|
| 2009 | Joe Gibbs Racing | 18 | Toyota | GRE | TRI | IOW | SBO; 5 | GLN | NHA | TMP | ADI; 16 | LRP | NHA; 9 | DOV | | 27th | 408 | |
| 2010 | Joe Gibbs Racing | 18 | Toyota | GRE; 23 | **SBO**; 1* | IOW; 1 | MAR; 17 | NHA; 21 | LRP; 3 | LEE; 16 | JFC; 12 | NHA; 24 | **DOV**; 18* | | | 8th | 1303 | |
| 2011 | Joe Gibbs Racing | 18 | Toyota | GRE; 21 | SBO; 3 | **RCH**; 4* | IOW; 2 | BGS; 4 | **JFC**; 1* | LGY; 3 | **NHA**; 1* | **COL**; 7 | GRE; 5 | NHA; 7 | DOV; 3 | 1st | 1937 | |

==== Camping World West Series ====
NASCAR Camping World West Series results
| Year | Team | No. | Make | 1 | 2 | 3 | 4 | 5 | 6 | 7 | 8 | 9 | 10 | 11 | 12 | 13 | NCWWSC | Pts | Ref |
|---|---|---|---|---|---|---|---|---|---|---|---|---|---|---|---|---|---|---|---|
| 2009 | Joe Gibbs Racing | 11 | Toyota | CTS | AAS | PHO | MAD | IOW | DCS | SON | IRW | PIR | MMP | CNS | IOW; 3 | AAS | 47th | 165 | |

^{*} Season still in progress
^{1} Ineligible for series points

=== ARCA Racing Series ===
(key) (Bold – Pole position awarded by qualifying time. Italics – Pole position earned by points standings or practice time. * – Most laps led.)

ARCA Racing Series results
| Year | Team | No. | Make | 1 | 2 | 3 | 4 | 5 | 6 | 7 | 8 | 9 | 10 | 11 | 12 | 13 | 14 | 15 | 16 | 17 | 18 | 19 | 20 | ARSC | Pts | Ref |
|---|---|---|---|---|---|---|---|---|---|---|---|---|---|---|---|---|---|---|---|---|---|---|---|---|---|---|
| 2010 | Gresham Motorsports | 71 | Toyota | DAY | PBE | **SLM**; 6 | TEX | TAL | TOL | POC | MCH | IOW; 10 | MFD; 1* | POC | BLN; 13 | NJE | ISF | CHI | DSF | TOL; 23 | SLM | KAN | CAR | 28th | 940 | |
| 2011 | Venturini Motorsports | 25 | Chevy | DAY | TAL | SLM; 15 | TOL | NJE | CHI | POC | | | | | IRP; 11 | | | | | | | | | 21st | 1360 | |
| 2011 | Venturini Motorsports | 25 | Toyota | | | | | | | | MCH; 2 | WIN | BLN; 13 | IOW | | **POC**; 6 | ISF | MAD | DSF | | **KAN**; 4 | TOL | | 21st | 1360 | |
| 2011 | Venturini Motorsports | 55 | Chevy | | | | | | | | | | | | | | | | | SLM; 10 | | | | 21st | 1360 | |
| 2012 | Joe Denette Motorsports | 9 | Chevy | DAY; 6 | MOB | SLM | TAL | TOL | ELK | POC | MCH | WIN | NJE | IOW | CHI | IRP | POC | BLN | ISF | MAD | SLM | DSF | KAN | 90th | 200 | |

Sporting positions
| Preceded by Ryan Truex | NASCAR K&N Pro Series East Champion; 2011 | Succeeded by Kyle Larson |
