= Damon Lusk =

American racing driver (born 1977)

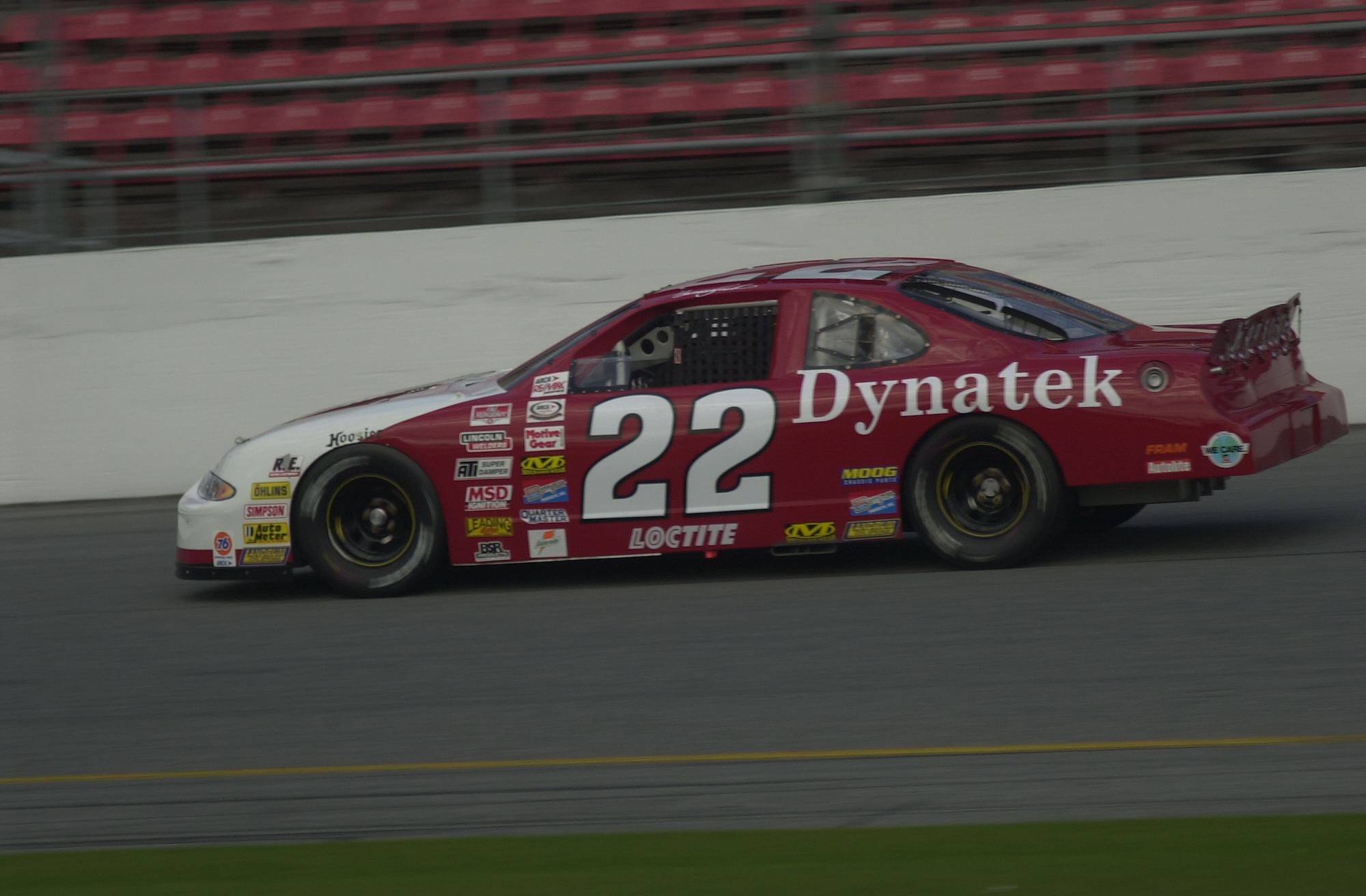
- Lusk's No. 22 ARCA car at Atlanta in 2002
- Born: September 18, 1977 (age 49) Kennewick, Washington, U.S.

ARCA Re/Max Series career
- Debut season: 2000
- Starts: 53
- Wins: 2
- Poles: 2
- Best finish: 17th in 2006
- Finished last season: 93rd (2009)

Previous series
- 1998–1999 1997–1999: NASCAR Southwest Series; NASCAR Northwest Series

NASCAR O'Reilly Auto Parts Series career
- 17 races run over 4 years
- Best finish: 47th (2003)
- First race: 1999 NAPA Autocare 250 (Pikes Peak)
- Last race: 2004 Diamond Hill Plywood 200 (Darlington)
Wins	Top tens	Poles
0	0	0

NASCAR FedEx Freight Truck Series career
- 6 races run over 2 years
- Best finish: 41st (2006)
- First race: 2001 Silverado 350 (Texas)
- Last race: 2006 Ford 200 (Homestead)
Wins	Top tens	Poles
0	0	0
- Statistics up to date as of June 24, 2020.

Damon Lusk (born September 18, 1977) is an American former professional stock car racing driver. He primarily competed in the ARCA Re/Max Series, where he scored two wins in 53 starts between 2000 and 2009. In addition, he ran part-time in the NASCAR Busch Series for six years (each year from 1999 to 2005 excluding 2000). This most notably included his 2003 campaign, when he left ARCA to focus on competing in the Busch Series, where he ran eleven races for Tommy Baldwin Racing.

== Racing career ==
Lusk entered NASCAR in 1997, competing in 28 NASCAR Northwest Series events from that year until 1999. He had the exact same stats in his 21 starts across two seasons with zero wins (1998 and 1999) in the NASCAR Southwest Series, but also won one pole position. After his three Northwest starts in 1999, specifically when he qualified his AOL/Kleenex No. 22 Chevy on the outside pole at Portland Speedway, he caught the eye of NASCAR Winston Cup Series driver Jimmy Spencer, who invited Lusk to drive his No. 12 Chevy in the Busch Series at Pikes Peak. He started dead last, but was able to improve enough to complete all but eight laps, and finished the race in 34th position.

In 2001, Lusk made his first Truck Series start. He drove the No. 37 BayPak Ford for Derrike Cope's Quest Motor Racing team at Texas Motor Speedway. He had an impressive debut, starting 21st and finishing eleventh. This was the only race he ran in that truck.

In 2002, Lusk was contacted by Tommy Baldwin Jr., a Winston Cup Series crew chief who wanted to form his own Busch Series team. Baldwin had driver Wally Dallenbach Jr. in for a few races. Lusk brought sponsorship from the West Virginia Department of Tourism to the No. 6 for the race at Richmond in September of that year. After qualifying 25th, Lusk was involved in an early wreck and finished 42nd. His next start came at Atlanta Motor Speedway, where Lusk started last on the grid but was able to drive through the field and finish 22nd in the race. In 2003, Sta-Rite agreed to a 10-race deal with Baldwin's team. This part-time schedule began at the season-opener at Daytona, where Lusk improved on his career best finish with a 21st. He was 22nd two weeks later at Las Vegas. At Texas Motor Speedway, Lusk was involved in a first-lap crash, relegating 43rd. For the rest of 2003, Lusk had a solid season. He was eighteenth at Loudon. He was twelfth at Michigan. Despite being a rookie, he only wrecked twice, and ended the season with an average finish was 25.5.

Lusk signed with BACE Motorsports to drive the No. 74 Outdoor Channel Chevy full-time and for rookie of the year in the Busch Series in 2004. He also joined the team for the 2003 series finale at Homestead-Miami to prepare for the following year. In that race, Lusk drove the team's No. 33 car, finishing eighteenth. In his first three starts in 2004 with the team, Lusk finished 21st at Daytona, 24th at Rockingham and 25th at Darlington. However, that was not good enough for BACE, who was trying to keep their team afloat due to struggling to find sponsorship for Lusk. As a result, Lusk was released and replaced by Tony Raines (who had driven for BACE when they had a team in the Cup Series in 2003) for the rest of the season.

In 2004, Lusk was scheduled to run two races (the second races at Fontana and Charlotte) in the Nextel Cup Series, driving the SWAT Fitness Racing No. 62 Chevrolet (owned by Larry Hollenbeck), but he withdrew from both events.

In 2005, Lusk was hired by Dan Kinney's Premier Motorsports team, and planned to drive the No. 85 House Hunter Chevrolet for twenty races. However, the team was greatly underfunded, and failing to qualify for his first three races in the car, he was replaced by John Hayden (although Lusk returned to attempt one more race in July, failing to qualify for that one as well). In ARCA that year, he joined Vision Racing to drive their No. 37 at Pocono, Gateway, and Michigan.

In 2006, Lusk started the season in the No. 37 again, but after the season-opening race at Daytona, he moved to Brack Maggard Racing's No. 65 Dodge, where he was scheduled to run full-time for the rest of the season. However, he left the team during the year for a Truck Series ride with Woodard Racing in the last five races of the season, replacing Boston Reid. Lusk earned a best finish of seventeenth at Atlanta Motor Speedway and finished 41st in points. Also, he returned to the Cup Series and was scheduled to compete in the second Pocono race in No. 64 Chevrolet for Premier, but he withdrew again.

In 2007, Lusk was scheduled to run part-time in the Nextel Cup Series in James Hylton's No. 58 Chevrolet, but the team did not attempt any races after failing to qualify for that year's Daytona 500 with Hylton driving. Although Lusk did not attempt to qualify for any Cup Series races in 2007, he did compete for in ARCA's season-opener at Daytona and at the Michigan ARCA 200 that year for Les Barnart's team. At Michigan, they ran the No. 25 instead of their usual No. 55 in order to use owner points from Venturini Motorsports. After making no starts in ARCA or NASCAR in 2008, Lusk returned to ARCA in 2009 for two races in the Hendren Motorsports No. 66 Ford at the dirt tracks of Springfield and DuQuoin, which would end up being his final stock car starts.

== Motorsports career results ==
=== NASCAR ===
(key) (Bold – Pole position awarded by qualifying time. Italics – Pole position earned by points standings or practice time. * – Most laps led.)

==== Busch Series ====
NASCAR Busch Series results
Year	Team	No.	Make	1	2	3	4	5	6	7	8	9	10	11	12	13	14	15	16	17	18	19	20	21	22	23	24	25	26	27	28	29	30	31	32	33	34	35	NBSC	Pts	Ref
1999	Mark Albertson	12	Chevy	DAY	CAR	LVS	ATL	DAR	TEX	NSV	BRI	TAL	CAL	NHA	RCH	NZH	CLT	DOV	SBO	GLN	MLW	MYB	PPR; 34	GTY	IRP	MCH	BRI	DAR	RCH	DOV	CLT	CAR	MEM						124th	61	
1999	Mark Albertson	70	Chevy																															PHO; DNQ	HOM				124th	61	
2001	Hensley Racing	80	Ford	DAY	CAR	LVS	ATL	DAR	BRI	TEX	NSH	TAL	CAL	RCH	NHA	NZH	CLT	DOV	KEN	MLW	GLN	CHI	GTY	PPR	IRP	MCH	BRI	DAR	RCH	DOV	KAN	CLT	MEM	PHO; DNQ	CAR	HOM			N/A	0	
2002	Tommy Baldwin Racing	6	Dodge	DAY	CAR	LVS	DAR	BRI	TEX	NSH	TAL	CAL	RCH	NHA	NZH	CLT	DOV	NSH	KEN	MLW	DAY	CHI	GTY	PPR	IRP	MCH	BRI	DAR	RCH; 42	DOV	KAN	CLT	MEM	ATL; 22	CAR	PHO	HOM		92nd	134	
2003	Tommy Baldwin Racing	6	Dodge	DAY; 21	CAR	LVS; 22	DAR	BRI	TEX; 43	TAL	NSH	CAL; 24	RCH	GTY	NZH	CLT; 29	DOV	NSH	KEN	MLW; 31	DAY; 21	CHI	NHA; 18	PPR	IRP	MCH; 12	BRI	DAR	RCH	DOV	KAN; 42	CLT	MEM	ATL	PHO	CAR			47th	950	
2003	BACE Motorsports	33	Chevy																																		HOM; 18		47th	950	
2004	BACE Motorsports	74	Chevy	DAY; 21	CAR; 24	LVS; DNQ	DAR; 25	BRI	TEX	NSH	TAL	CAL	GTY	RCH	NZH	CLT	DOV	NSH	KEN	MLW	DAY	CHI	NHA	PPR	IRP	MCH	BRI	CAL	RCH	DOV	KAN	CLT	MEM	ATL	PHO	DAR	HOM		78th	284	
2005	Premier Motorsports	85	Chevy	DAY	CAL	MXC	LVS; DNQ	ATL; DNQ	NSH; DNQ	BRI	TEX	PHO	TAL	DAR	RCH	CLT	DOV	NSH																					N/A	0	
2005	Premier Motorsports	85	Ford																KEN; DNQ	MLW	DAY	CHI	NHA	PPR	GTY	IRP	GLN	MCH	BRI	CAL	RCH	DOV	KAN	CLT	MEM	TEX	PHO	HOM	N/A	0	

==== Craftsman Truck Series ====
NASCAR Craftsman Truck Series results
Year	Team	No.	Make	1	2	3	4	5	6	7	8	9	10	11	12	13	14	15	16	17	18	19	20	21	22	23	24	25	NCTC	Pts	Ref
2001	Quest Motor Racing	37	Ford	DAY	HOM	MMR	MAR	GTY	DAR	PPR	DOV	TEX	MEM	MLW	KAN	KEN	NHA	IRP	NSH	CIC	NZH	RCH	SBO	TEX; 11	LVS	PHO	CAL		89th	130	
2006	Woodard Racing	25	Dodge	DAY	CAL	ATL	MAR	GTY	CLT	MFD	DOV	TEX	MCH	MLW	KAN	KEN	MEM	IRP	NSH	BRI	NHA	LVS	TAL	MAR; 36	ATL; 17	TEX; 18	PHO; 26	HOM; 18	41st	470	

=== ARCA Racing Series ===
(key) (Bold – Pole position awarded by qualifying time. Italics – Pole position earned by points standings or practice time. * – Most laps led.)

ARCA Re/Max Series results
Year	Team	No.	Make	1	2	3	4	5	6	7	8	9	10	11	12	13	14	15	16	17	18	19	20	21	22	23	24	25	ARMC	Pts	Ref
2000	Fenley-Hylton Motorsports	15	Ford	DAY; DNQ	SLM	AND																							19th	1680	
2000	Damon Lusk Racing	15	Ford				CLT; 20	KIL	FRS	MCH																			19th	1680	
2000	Capital City Motorsports	38	Ford								POC; 30	TOL	KEN; 17	BLN															19th	1680	
2000	Fenley Motorsports	38	Ford												POC; 9														19th	1680	
2000	Hylton Motorsports	48	Ford													WIN; 11	**ISF**; 11	KEN; 13	DSF; 24	SLM; 9	CLT; 33	TAL							19th	1680	
2000	Bob Schacht Motorsports	75	Ford																				ATL; 4						19th	1680	
2001	Bob Schacht Motorsports	28	Ford	DAY	NSH	WIN	SLM	GTY	KEN	CLT; 24	KAN	MCH	POC	MEM															42nd	895	
2001	Fenley Motorsports	15	Ford												GLN; 12	KEN	MCH		NSH; 32	ISF	CHI	DSF	SLM	TOL	BLN	CLT	TAL; 16		42nd	895	
2001	Curt Piercy	10	Ford															POC; 7											42nd	895	
2001	WP Motorsports	22	Chevy																									ATL; 8	42nd	895	
2002	WP Motorsports	22	Pontiac	DAY; 5																									20th	2765	
2002	WP Motorsports	22	Chevy		ATL; 1	NSH; 7	SLM; 8	KEN; 9	CLT; 3	KAN; 3	POC; 1	MCH; 2	TOL; 9*	SBO; 19	KEN	BLN	POC	NSH	ISF	WIN	DSF	CHI	SLM	TAL	CLT				20th	2765	
2004	Capital City Motorsports	38	Ford	DAY	NSH	SLM	KEN	TOL	CLT; 28	KAN	POC	MCH	SBO	BLN	KEN	GTW	POC	LER	NSH	ISF	TOL	DSF; 27	CHI	SLM	TAL				118th	185	
2005	Vision Racing	37	Chevy	DAY	NSH	SLM	KEN	TOL	LAN	MIL	POC	MCH	KAN	KEN	BLN	POC; 27	GTW; 14	LER	NSH	MCH; 17	ISF	TOL	DSF	CHI	SLM	TAL			70th	400	
2006	Vision Racing	37	Dodge	DAY; 5																									17th	3265	
2006	Brack Maggard Racing	65	Dodge		NSH; 8	SLM; 7	WIN; 18	KEN; 17	TOL; 21	POC; 7	MCH; 20	KAN; 24	KEN; 5		POC; 9	GTW; 41	NSH; 5	MCH; 14	**ISF**; 8	MIL	TOL	DSF	CHI	SLM	TAL	IOW			17th	3265	
2006	Fast Track Racing	11	Pontiac											BLN; 32															17th	3265	
2007	LB Motorsports	55	Dodge	DAY; 26	USA	NSH	SLM	KAN	WIN	KEN	TOL	IOW	POC																87th	285	
2007	LB Motorsports	25	Dodge											MCH; 9	BLN	KEN	POC	NSH	ISF	MIL	GTW	DSF	CHI	SLM	TAL	TOL			87th	285	
2009	Hendren Motorsports	66	Ford	DAY	SLM	CAR	TAL	KEN	TOL	POC	MCH	MFD	IOW	KEN	BLN	POC	ISF; 29	CHI	TOL	DSF; 16	NJE	SLM	KAN	CAR					93rd	235	
