= 2013 Chevrolet Silverado 250 =

Race details
- Race 14 of 22 in the 2013 NASCAR Camping World Truck Series season
- A map showing the layout of Canadian Tire Motorsport Park
- Date: September 1, 2013
- Location: Canadian Tire Motorsport Park, Bowmanville, Ontario
- Course: Permanent racing facility
- Course length: 2.459 miles (3.957 km)
- Distance: 64 laps, 157.4 mi (253.47 km)
- Average speed: 86.775 mph (139.651 km/h)

Pole position
Driver	James Buescher	Turner Scott Motorsports
- Time: 81.074 seconds

Most laps led
Driver	Ty Dillon	Richard Childress Racing
- Laps: 25

Winner
No. 94	Chase Elliott	Hendrick Motorsports

Television in the United States
- Network: Fox Sports 1
- Announcers: Rick Allen, Phil Parsons, Michael Waltrip

The 2013 Chevrolet Silverado 250 was a NASCAR Camping World Truck Series race held on September 1, 2013. Contested over 64 laps, the race was the inaugural running of the Chevrolet Silverado 250 at Canadian Tire Motorsport Park in Bowmanville, Ontario, and the fourteenth of the 2013 NASCAR Camping World Truck Series season. The race was the first Truck race in Canada and the first road course race since 2000.

James Buescher of Turner Scott Motorsports won the pole position, while Hendrick Motorsports' Chase Elliott won the race in controversial fashion, when he turned Ty Dillon in the final turn on the last lap. Afterwards, Mike Skeen and Max Papis were involved in a post-race incident where Skeen's girlfriend slapped Papis for contact on the final lap.

== Background ==
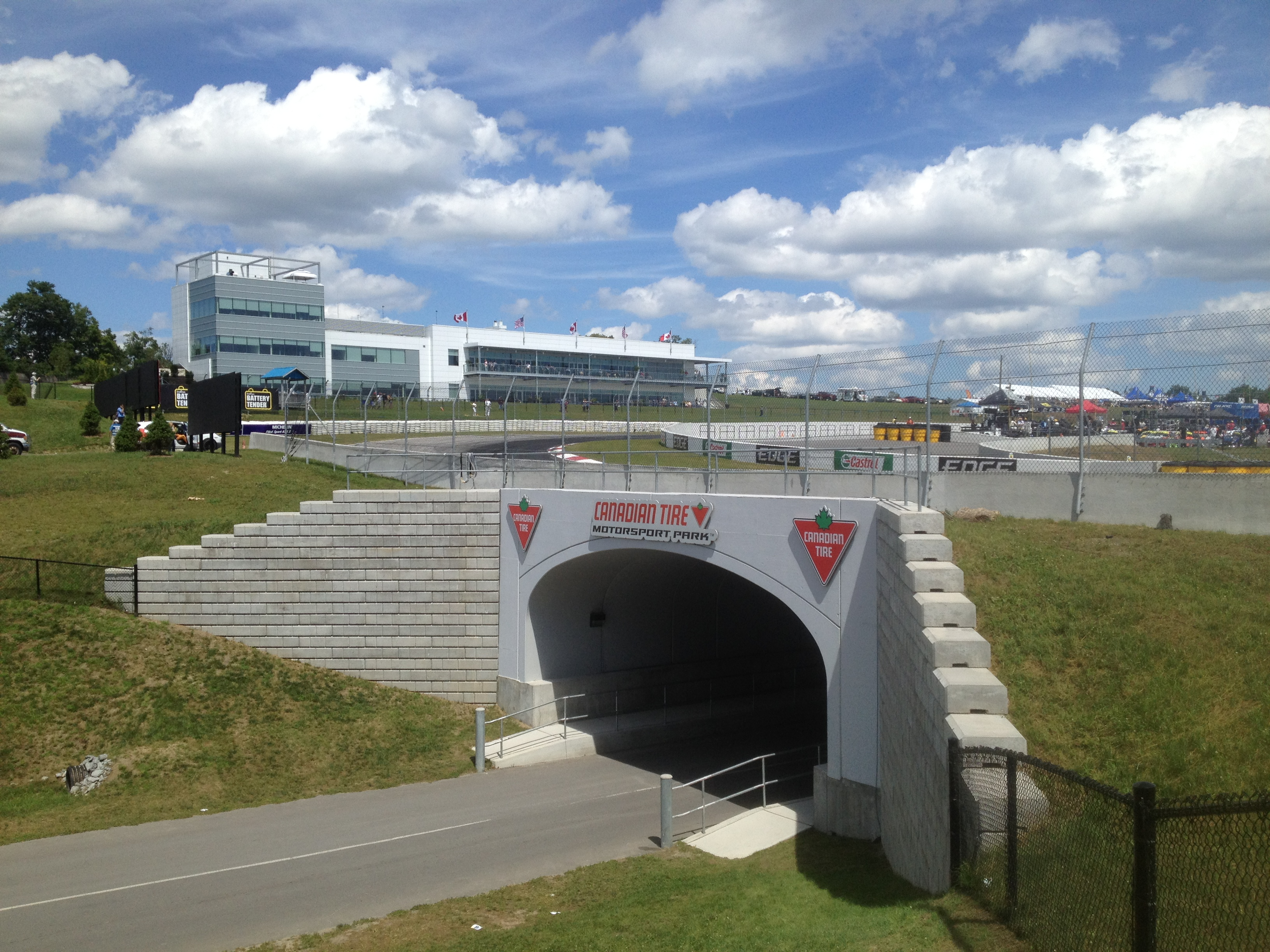
Canadian Tire Motorsport Park, where the race was held.

Opened in 1961, Canadian Tire Motorsport Park is 2.61 miles (4.20 km) long and features 10 turns. has held NASCAR races before, with the Canadian Tire Series' Clarington 200 since 2007. On November 28, 2012, it was announced that the track would host a Truck Series race on Labour Day weekend, the second addition to the 2013 schedule after the Mudsummer Classic at Eldora Speedway. The Chevrolet Silverado 250 marked the first Truck race in Canada and the first road course race since 2000 at Watkins Glen International.

The driver age restriction was reduced from 18 to 16 years for tracks like CTMP. Among the drivers entered for the event included Mike Skeen, who won the previous four Pirelli World Challenge GT Series races at the track, along with Canadian Tire drivers Martin Roy and Alex Guenette. To practice for the event, Jeb Burton, Ty Dillon and James Buescher also ran the CTS race at the track.

Entering the race, Matt Crafton led the points standings with 498 points, followed by Buescher and Burton, who had 449 and 445 points, respectively. Dillon and Timothy Peters comprised the top five with 440 and 426 points each, while the top ten featured Miguel Paludo (422), Ryan Blaney (421), Brendan Gaughan (418), Johnny Sauter (409) and Joey Coulter (399).

== Qualifying ==
Four practice sessions were held on August 30; the first two were dominated by Mike Skeen, while the third and fourth were led by Chase Elliott. 30 drivers entered the race, with qualifying taking place on August 31. Skeen, Elliott, Chris Lafferty and Jennifer Jo Cobb were required to qualify on time. James Buescher won the pole position with a lap speed of 109.189 miles per hour (175.723 km/h), his second pole of 2013 and fifth of his career. Skeen, Elliott, Miguel Paludo and Ty Dillon rounded out the top five, while the top ten included Max Papis, Chad Hackenbracht, Bubba Wallace and Brendan Gaughan. The top-qualifying Canadian driver was Alex Guenette, who qualified 14th. Bryan Silas was ordered to the rear of the field due to unapproved adjustments.

=== Qualifying results ===
Pos	No.	Driver	Team	Manufacturer	Time	Speed
1	31	James Buescher	Turner Scott Motorsports	Chevrolet	81.074	109.189
2	29	Ryan Blaney	Brad Keselowski Racing	Ford	81.091	109.166
3	6	Mike Skeen	Sharp Gallaher Racing	Chevrolet	81.158	109.079
4	94	Chase Elliott	Hendrick Motorsports	Chevrolet	81.267	108.930
5	32	Miguel Paludo	Turner Scott Motorsports	Chevrolet	81.297	108.890
6	3	Ty Dillon	Richard Childress Racing	Chevrolet	81.338	108.835
7	14	Max Papis	NTS Motorsports	Chevrolet	81.420	108.725
8	51	Chad Hackenbracht	Kyle Busch Motorsports	Toyota	81.598	108.488
9	54	Bubba Wallace	Kyle Busch Motorsports	Toyota	81.769	108.262
10	62	Brendan Gaughan	Richard Childress Racing	Chevrolet	81.877	108.118
11	4	Jeb Burton	Turner Scott Motorsports	Chevrolet	82.047	107.894
12	77	Germán Quiroga	Red Horse Racing	Toyota	82.112	108.809
13	88	Matt Crafton	ThorSport Racing	Toyota	82.323	107.533
14	39	Alex Guenette	Dave Jacombs Racing	Chevrolet	82.323	107.533
15	17	Timothy Peters	Red Horse Racing	Toyota	82.432	107.390
16	98	Johnny Sauter	ThorSport Racing	Toyota	82.552	107.234
17	9	Ron Hornaday Jr.	NTS Motorsports	Chevrolet	82.577	107.202
18	19	Ross Chastain	Brad Keselowski Racing	Ford	82.613	107.155
19	18	Joey Coulter	Kyle Busch Motorsports	Toyota	82.628	107.136
20	24	Brennan Newberry	NTS Motorsports	Chevrolet	82.786	106.931
21	84	Martin Roy	Glenden Enterprises	Chevrolet	83.508	106.007
22	60	Dakoda Armstrong	Turn One Racing	Chevrolet	83.621	105.863
23	8	Max Gresham	Sharp Gallaher Racing	Chevrolet	83.946	105.454
24	99	Bryan Silas	TR32	Ford	84.295	105.017
25	7	John Wes Townley	Red Horse Racing	Toyota	85.108	104.014
26	81	Derek White	SS-Green Light Racing	Chevrolet	86.433	102.419
27	07	Carl Long	SS-Green Light Racing	Chevrolet	89.692	98.698
28	10	Jennifer Jo Cobb	JJC Racing	Ram	94.000	94.174
29	0	Chris Lafferty	JJC Racing	Chevrolet	94.014	94.160
30	57	Norm Benning	Norm Benning Racing	Chevrolet	95.417	92.776

== Race ==
Pole-sitter James Buescher led for the first two laps before Chase Elliott took the lead, leading for 23 laps until lap 26, when Ryan Blaney claimed it, leading for two laps until it was relinquished to Ty Dillon. Germán Quiroga and Miguel Paludo also led laps, the former leading laps 34–36 and the latter leading 37–46; Dillon took the lead again on lap 48. Prior to lap 48, three cautions were waved: on lap 8 for Max Gresham stalling in turn 5, on lap 33 for Jennifer Jo Cobb's stall in turn 2, and on lap 47 with Alex Guenette also stalling in turn 4. Dillon continued to lead for 17 laps from lap 47 to 63, and on lap 58, Johnny Sauter stalled in turn 6. In the final turn of the last lap, Elliott turned Dillon into the tire barrier, which brought out the caution, to claim his first career NASCAR win in his sixth series start, becoming the youngest Truck Series race winner at 17 years, 9 months, 4 days. Followed by Elliott was Chad Hackenbracht, Paludo, Bubba Wallace, Ron Hornaday Jr., Max Papis, Ross Chastain, Timothy Peters, Buescher and Matt Crafton. Derek White (rear hub), Guenette (oil line), Brennan Newberry (transmission), Sauter (gas line), Carl Long (brakes) and Chris Lafferty (clutch) failed to finish the race.

The race featured seven lead changes, six different leaders and five caution periods.

== Post-race ==
In victory lane, Elliott stated about the wreck:

"We only have so many shots to win these things. I really hate to win them like that, I really do. That's not how I race and that's never been how I've raced before. I had a shot. I was up next to Ty and I knew he was going to try and chop me off. I tried to make up the difference. ... Sometimes you've got to do what you've got to do to get to victory lane."

Meanwhile, Dillon, who finished 17th, said, "You've got to show respect. I hope he runs Iowa (next week). He won't finish the race." The following week at the Fan Appreciation 200, Elliott crashed on lap 35, finishing 31st.

Also on the final lap, Max Papis and Mike Skeen battled for second when they made contact in the final turn, and after the race, Skeen's pit crew, along with Skeen's girlfriend, attacked Papis. Papis later accused Skeen's girlfriend of dislocating his jaw, saying, "This crazy lady comes shouting at me, and I had no idea, didn't even understand her, she just started shouting. And all the sudden, she took a full hand – and she slapped me so hard. I'm not kidding. My jaw got dislocated and my left ear is still ringing, big time." Papis later redacted his statements, citing language barriers. On September 4, 2013, NASCAR suspended Skeen's girlfriend indefinitely from all NASCAR events, while crew chief Bryan Berry was fined $2,500.

Another post-race altercation involved Germán Quiroga and crews for James Buescher after the two and Ron Hornaday tangled in the final laps. Quiroga was spun out on the final lap and tried to confront Buescher in the pits before being restrained by NASCAR officials.

== Results ==
Pos	Grid	No.	Driver	Team	Manufacturer	Laps	Points
1	4	94	Chase Elliott	Hendrick Motorsports	Chevrolet	64	47
2	8	51	Chad Hackenbracht	Kyle Busch Motorsports	Toyota	64	42
3	5	32	Miguel Paludo	Turner Scott Motorsports	Chevrolet	64	42
4	9	54	Bubba Wallace #	Kyle Busch Motorsports	Toyota	64	40
5	17	9	Ron Hornaday Jr.	NTS Motorsports	Chevrolet	64	39
6	7	14	Max Papis	NTS Motorsports	Chevrolet	64	0
7	18	19	Ross Chastain	Brad Keselowski Racing	Ford	64	37
8	15	17	Timothy Peters	Red Horse Racing	Toyota	64	36
9	1	31	James Buescher	Turner Scott Motorsports	Chevrolet	64	36
10	13	88	Matt Crafton	ThorSport Racing	Toyota	64	34
11	24	99	Bryan Silas	TR32	Ford	64	33
12	25	7	John Wes Townley	Red Horse Racing	Toyota	64	32
13	3	6	Mike Skeen	Sharp Gallaher Racing	Chevrolet	64	31
14	21	84	Martin Roy	Glenden Enterprises	Chevrolet	64	0
15	12	77	Germán Quiroga #	Red Horse Racing	Toyota	64	30
16	2	29	Ryan Blaney #	Brad Keselowski Racing	Ford	64	29
17	6	3	Ty Dillon	Richard Childress Racing	Chevrolet	64	29
18	10	62	Brendan Gaughan	Richard Childress Racing	Chevrolet	62	26
19	22	60	Dakoda Armstrong	Turn One Racing	Chevrolet	61	25
20	30	57	Norm Benning	Norm Benning Racing	Chevrolet	57	24
21	26	81	Derek White	SS-Green Light Racing	Chevrolet	55	0
22	11	4	Jeb Burton #	Turner Scott Motorsports	Chevrolet	54	22
23	28	10	Jennifer Jo Cobb	JJC Racing	Ram	52	21
24	23	8	Max Gresham	Sharp Gallaher Racing	Chevrolet	47	20
25	14	39	Alex Guenette	Dave Jacombs Racing	Chevrolet	45	19
26	19	18	Joey Coulter	Kyle Busch Motorsports	Toyota	41	18
27	20	24	Brennan Newberry #	NTS Motorsports	Chevrolet	38	17
28	16	98	Johnny Sauter	ThorSport Racing	Toyota	34	16
29	27	07	Carl Long	SS-Green Light Racing	Chevrolet	4	0
30	29	0	Chris Lafferty	JJC Racing	Chevrolet	3	14
# Rookie of the Year candidate Source:

=== Standings after the race ===
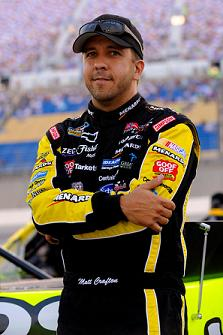
Matt Crafton (seen in 2011) led the points standings after the race.

Pos	Driver	Points
1	Matt Crafton	532
2	James Buescher	485
3	Ty Dillon	469
4	Jeb Burton	467
5	Miguel Paludo	464
6	Timothy Peters	462
7	Ryan Blaney	450
8	Brendan Gaughan	444
9	Bubba Wallace	426
10	Johnny Sauter	425
