= Boston Reid =

American racing driver (born 1982)

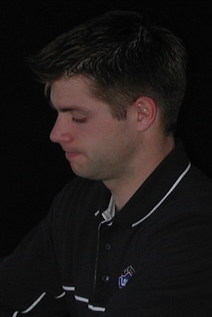
- Reid in 2005
- Born: December 29, 1982 (age 43); Logansport, Indiana, U.S.
- Awards: 2002 USAC Rookie of the Year; 2002 National Sprint Car Hall of Fame Non-Wing Rookie of the Year

NASCAR O'Reilly Auto Parts Series career
- 10 races run over 2 years
- Best finish: 65th (2005)
- First race: 2004 Emerson Radio 250 (Richmond)
- Last race: 2005 Kroger 200 (IRP)
Wins	Top tens	Poles
0	0	0

NASCAR FedEx Freight Truck Series career
- 21 races run over 2 years
- Best finish: 26th (2006)
- First race: 2006 GM Flex Fuel 250 (Daytona)
- Last race: 2007 Michigan 200 (Michigan)
Wins	Top tens	Poles
0	0	0
- Statistics up to date as of June 19, 2006.

Boston Reid (born December 29, 1982) is an American former stock car racing driver who has previously competed in the NASCAR Busch Series, the NASCAR Craftsman Truck Series, and the United States Auto Club.

== Early life and education ==
Reid was born in Logansport, Indiana, where his father Lynn Reid, a former Indy car chief, was the Honda Motorcycle dealer; he later moved his shop to Kokomo, Indiana. Reid is a 2001 Graduate of Taylor High School. Reid began racing at the age of seven before moving on to the World Karting Association two years later. By the time he was twelve years old, he was racing 80cc go-karts and mini-sprint cars under the tutelage of his father.

== Professional racing career ==
In 1995, Reid won the Rookie of the Year division in the Mini Sprint 600cc division at Miami County Speedway. He won the track championship at that track over the next two years. In 1999, Reid moved to the Great Lakes Outlaw Sprint Series, a sprint car division based in the Midwest. He drove the George K. Devine Special number 9 to several race wins over the next two years. Reid garnered more awards, the 2002 USAC Sprint Car Rookie of the Year, and the National Sprint Car Hall of Fame Non-Wing Rookie of the Year. He got his first win that year at Eldora Speedway.

He would go on to participate in the Red Bull Racing Formula One U.S. driver search program at the Paul Ricard Circuit. In 2004, Reid signed a driver development contract with Hendrick Motorsports. He made his Busch Series debut later that year at Richmond International Raceway with NEMCO Motorsports, finishing 37th after a crash. He made two more starts that year. In 2005, he raced seven races for Hendrick in the Busch Series. His best race was at Nashville Superspeedway, where he started and finished seventeenth. Unfortunately, he was released from his contract at Hendrick at the end of the year.

In 2006, Reid was a rookie in the Craftsman Truck Series circuit with the new Woodard Racing team. He had run 20 races with a best finish of 13th when he was replaced by Damon Lusk.

Before working with Hendrick's development program, Reid was mentored by four-time Winston Cup champion Jeff Gordon and his father, Lynn.

== Personal life ==
Reid is currently a successful Real Estate agent in Charlotte, North Carolina, and Founding Partner of Lead 2 Real Estate Group, (started in 2011), a firm that specializes in assisting the racing community with their real estate needs. He is married to Shanda, they have one son Hudson (born in 2012) and as of 2014, they announced they expecting another in March 2014.

Boston Reid & Co. is currently the series title sponsor of the Pro Division of the Legends Car Summer Shootout at Charlotte Motor Speedway.

== Motorsports career results ==
=== NASCAR ===
(key) (Bold – Pole position awarded by qualifying time. Italics – Pole position earned by points standings or practice time. * – Most laps led.)

==== Busch Series ====
NASCAR Busch Series results
Year	Team	No.	Make	1	2	3	4	5	6	7	8	9	10	11	12	13	14	15	16	17	18	19	20	21	22	23	24	25	26	27	28	29	30	31	32	33	34	35	NBSC	Pts	Ref
2004	Hendrick Motorsports	87	Chevy	DAY	CAR	LVS	DAR	BRI	TEX	NSH	TAL	CAL	GTY	RCH	NZH	CLT	DOV	NSH	KEN	MLW	DAY	CHI	NHA	PPR	IRP	MCH	BRI	CAL	RCH; 37	DOV	KAN	CLT; 42	MEM	ATL; 26	PHO	DAR	HOM		97th	174	
2005	Hendrick Motorsports	5	Chevy	DAY	CAL; 22	MXC	LVS	ATL	NSH; 30	BRI	TEX	PHO; 39	TAL	DAR	RCH	CLT	DOV	NSH; 17	KEN	MLW	DAY	CHI	NHA; 36	PPR	GTY; 25														65th	555	
2005	Hendrick Motorsports	57	Chevy																							IRP; 28	GLN	MCH	BRI	CAL	RCH	DOV	KAN	CLT	MEM	TEX	PHO	HOM	65th	555	

==== Craftsman Truck Series ====
NASCAR Craftsman Truck Series results
Year	Team	No.	Make	1	2	3	4	5	6	7	8	9	10	11	12	13	14	15	16	17	18	19	20	21	22	23	24	25	NCTC	Pts	Ref
2006	Woodard & Sharp Racing	25	Dodge	DAY; 36	CAL; 34	ATL; 24	MAR; 31	GTY; 16	CLT; 16	MFD; 14	DOV; 33	TEX; 17	MCH; 17	MLW; 26	KAN; 28	KEN; 14	MEM; 24	IRP; 24	NSH; 14	BRI; 28	NHA; 33	LVS; 33	TAL; 29	MAR	ATL	TEX	PHO	HOM	26th	1792	
2007	Xpress Motorsports	16	Ford	DAY	CAL	ATL	MAR	KAN	CLT	MFD	DOV	TEX	MCH; 35	MLW	MEM	KEN	IRP	NSH	BRI	GTW	NHA	LVS	TAL	MAR	ATL	TEX	PHO	HOM	110th	58	

=== ARCA Re/Max Series ===
(key) (Bold – Pole position awarded by qualifying time. Italics – Pole position earned by points standings or practice time. * – Most laps led.)

ARCA Re/Max Series results
Year	Team	No.	Make	1	2	3	4	5	6	7	8	9	10	11	12	13	14	15	16	17	18	19	20	21	22	ARSC	Pts	Ref
2004	Hendrick Motorsports	5	Chevy	DAY	NSH	SLM	KEN	TOL; 3	CLT	KAN; 8	POC	MCH	SBO	BLN	KEN; 6	GTW	POC	LER	NSH	ISF	TOL	DSF	CHI	SLM		36th	750	
2004	Hendrick Motorsports	7	Chevy																						TAL; 23	36th	750	
