= 2013 Kroger 200 =

Race details
- Race 19 of 22 in the 2013 NASCAR Camping World Truck Series season
- A map showing the layout of Martinsville Speedway
- Date: October 26, 2013; 12 years ago
- Location: Martinsville Speedway, Ridgeway, Virginia
- Course: Permanent racing facility
- Course length: 0.526 miles (0.847 km)
- Distance: 200 laps, 105.2 mi (169.302 km)
- Weather: Temperatures reaching up to 57 °F (14 °C); wind speeds up to 12 miles per hour (19 km/h)
- Average speed: 66.594 mph (107.173 km/h)

Pole position
Driver	Denny Hamlin	Kyle Busch Motorsports
- Time: 19.625 sec

Most laps led
Driver	Bubba Wallace	Kyle Busch Motorsports
- Laps: 96

Winner
No. 54	Bubba Wallace	Kyle Busch Motorsports

Television in the United States
- Network: Fox Sports 1
- Announcers: Rick Allen, Phil Parsons, Michael Waltrip

The 2013 Kroger 200 was a NASCAR Camping World Truck Series race held on October 26, 2013 at Martinsville Speedway in Ridgeway, Virginia. Contested over 200 laps, the race was the nineteenth of the 2013 season. Bubba Wallace of Kyle Busch Motorsports won the race. Brendan Gaughan finished second and Jeb Burton finished third.

== Race ==
Bubba Wallace led 96 laps in winning the race, becoming the first African American driver to win in the Camping World Truck Series, and the first African American driver to win in a NASCAR national touring series since Wendell Scott won a Grand National Series race, the 1964 Jacksonville 200, at Speedway Park in Jacksonville on December 1, 1963.

== Results ==
Pos	Grid	No.	Driver	Team	Manufacturer	Laps	Points
1	3	54	Bubba Wallace #	Kyle Busch Motorsports	Toyota	200	48
2	15	62	Brendan Gaughan	Richard Childress Racing	Chevrolet	200	42
3	9	4	Jeb Burton #	Turner Scott Motorsports	Chevrolet	200	41
4	14	30	Ben Kennedy	Turner Scott Motorsports	Chevrolet	200	40
5	24	29	Ryan Blaney #	Brad Keselowski Racing	Ford	200	39
6	1	51	Denny Hamlin	Kyle Busch Motorsports	Toyota	200	0
7	6	77	Germán Quiroga #	Red Horse Racing	Toyota	200	37
8	2	98	Johnny Sauter	ThorSport Racing	Toyota	200	37
9	28	92	Scott Riggs	RBR Enterprises	Chevrolet	200	0
10	7	31	James Buescher	Turner Scott Motorsports	Chevrolet	200	34
11	26	8	Max Gresham	Sharp Gallaher Racing	Chevrolet	200	33
12	22	18	Joey Coulter	Kyle Busch Motorsports	Toyota	200	32
13	17	7	John Wes Townley	Red Horse Racing	Toyota	200	31
14	8	19	Ross Chastain	Brad Keselowski Racing	Ford	200	31
15	11	27	Jeff Agnew	Hillman Racing	Chevrolet	200	29
16	30	22	John Hunter Nemechek	SWM-NEMCO Racing	Toyota	200	28
17	13	88	Matt Crafton	ThorSport Racing	Toyota	200	27
18	29	60	Dakoda Armstrong	Turn One Racing	Chevrolet	200	26
19	23	33	Brandon Jones	Turner Scott Motorsports	Chevrolet	200	25
20	12	94	Chase Elliott	Hendrick Motorsports	Chevrolet	200	24
21	20	32	Miguel Paludo	Turner Scott Motorsports	Chevrolet	200	23
22	5	3	Ty Dillon	Richard Childress Racing	Chevrolet	200	23
23	19	75	Caleb Holman	Henderson Motorsports	Chevrolet	199	21
24	31	24	Brennan Newberry #	NTS Motorsports	Chevrolet	199	20
25	18	39	Ryan Sieg	RSS Racing	Chevrolet	197	19
26	10	17	Timothy Peters	Red Horse Racing	Toyota	195	18
27	36	68	Clay Greenfield	Clay Greenfield Motorsports	Ram	195	0
28	4	9	Ron Hornaday Jr.	NTS Motorsports	Chevrolet	194	16
29	35	57	Norm Benning	Norm Benning Racing	Chevrolet	193	15
30	21	14	Kevin Harvick	NTS Motorsports	Chevrolet	189	0
31	27	81	Timmy Hill	SS-Green Light Racing	Chevrolet	186	0
32	16	6	Daniel Hemric	Sharp Gallaher Racing	Chevrolet	140	12
33	33	99	Bryan Silas	T3R Motorsports	Ford	137	11
34	32	84	Brad Riethmeyer	Glenden Enterprises	Chevrolet	52	10
35	25	93	Chris Jones	RSS Racing	Chevrolet	11	9
36	34	07	Jimmy Weller III	SS-Green Light Racing	Toyota	6	8
# Rookie of the Year candidate Source:

== Standings after the race ==
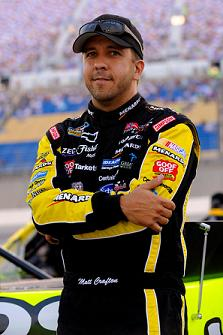
After the race, Matt Crafton remained in the points lead with 707.

Pos	Driver	Points
1	Matt Crafton	707
2	James Buescher	656
3	Ty Dillon	646
4	Jeb Burton	639
5	Johnny Sauter	625
6	Ryan Blaney	615
7	Miguel Paludo	615
8	Bubba Wallace	614
9	Brendan Gaughan	595
10	Timothy Peters	592
