= NASCAR Craftsman Truck Series at Rockingham Speedway =

NASCAR Craftsman Truck Series race held at Rockingham

Black's Tire 200

NASCAR Craftsman Truck Series
- Venue: Rockingham Speedway
- Location: Rockingham, North Carolina, United States
- Corporate sponsor: Black's Tire Service
- First race: 2012
- Last race: 2026
- Distance: 188 miles (303 km)
- Laps: 200
- Previous names: Good Sam Roadside Assistance Carolina 200 Presented by Cheerwine (2012); North Carolina Education Lottery 200 at The Rock Presented by Cheerwine (2013)
- Most wins (team): Turner Scott Motorsports (2)
- Most wins (manufacturer): Chevrolet (3)

Circuit information
- Surface: Asphalt
- Length: 0.940 mi (1.513 km)
- Turns: 4

Pickup truck racing events in the NASCAR Craftsman Truck Series have been held at the Rockingham Speedway in Rockingham, North Carolina in 2012 and 2013, and again in 2025 and 2026. Corey Heim is the final race winner.

== History ==
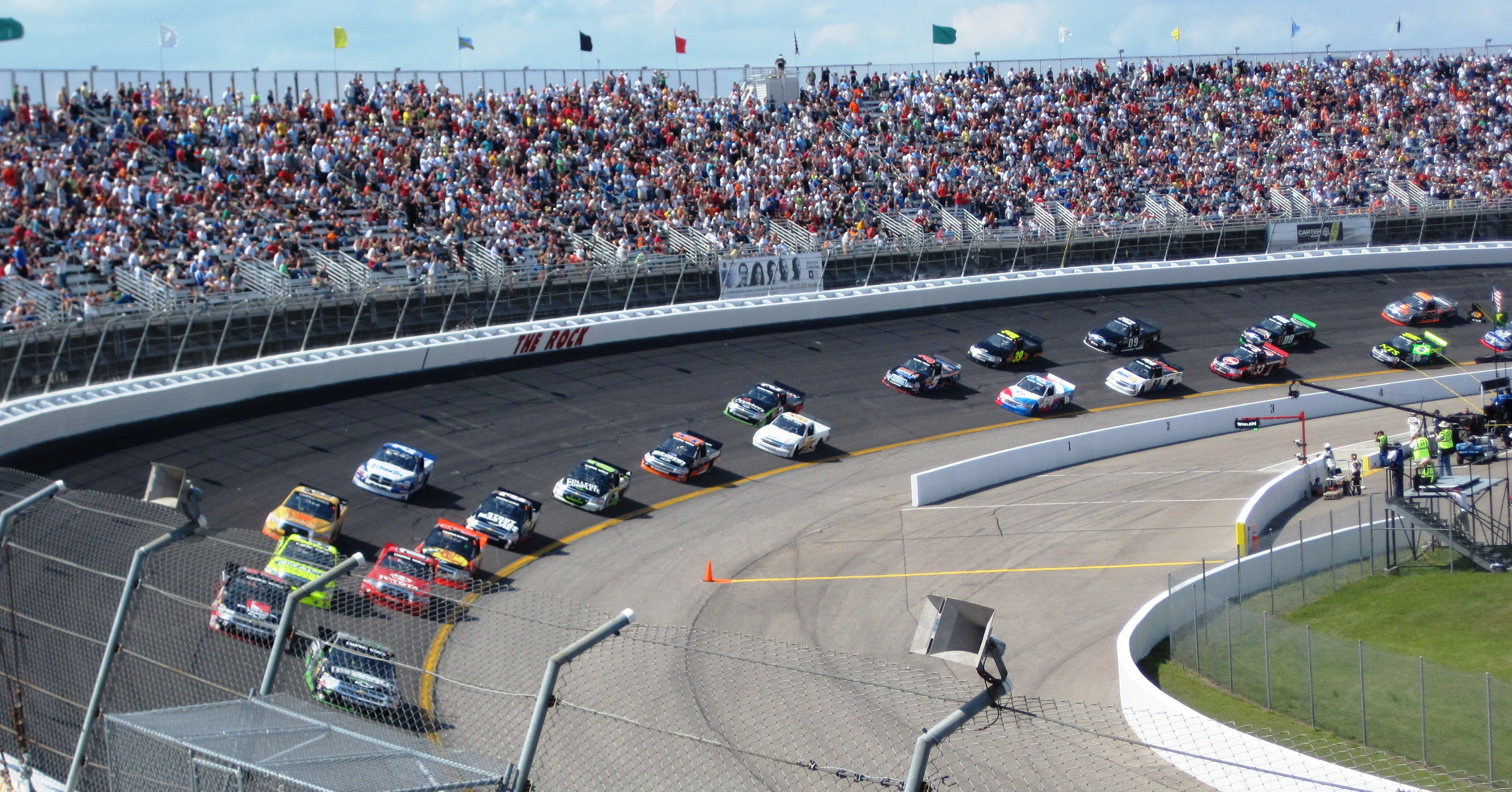
The inaugural race in 2012

On September 2, 2011, NASCAR announced that Rockingham Speedway would hold a Camping World Truck Series event for the 2012 season. The inaugural race was run on April 15, 2012, and was won by Kasey Kahne.

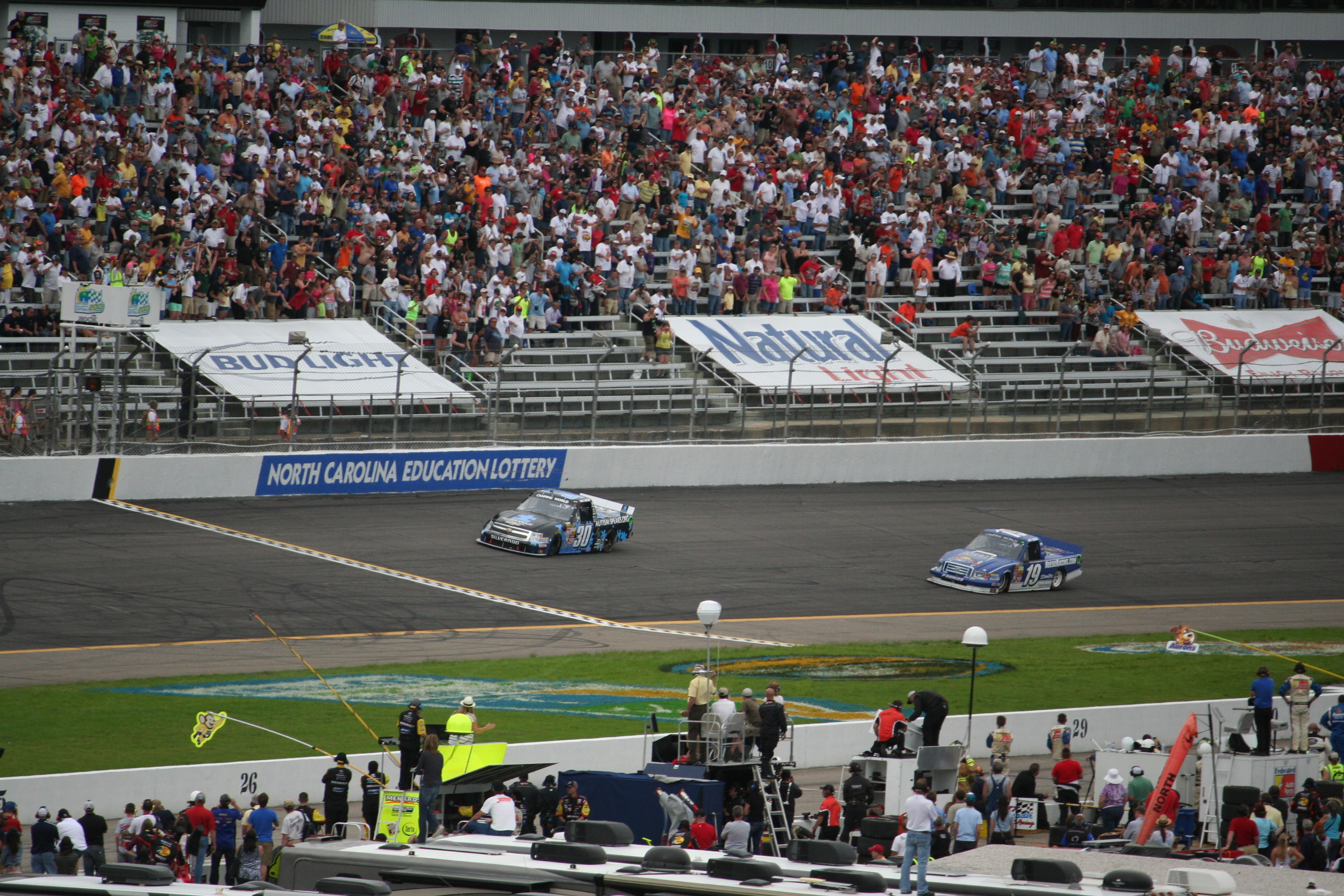
Kyle Larson beats Joey Logano to win the 2013 event

In 2013, Kyle Larson won his first truck series win in his first year but the race became notable because of controversy. Truck series veteran Ron Hornaday Jr. got contact with Kyle Busch Motorsports driver; the rookie Bubba Wallace In a similar fashion to an incident with Kyle Busch at Texas two years prior in the WinStar World Casino 350K. Hornaday tapped Wallace sending him into the fences. Ron Hornaday took responsibility and apologized but claimed that he did not intend to wreck Wallace; NASCAR, the media and fans felt differently when they saw a video that showed Hornaday frowning towards Wallace's truck before the tap. NASCAR black-flagged Hornaday and sent him to the back of the field on the restart, later fined him $25,000 and put him on probation until June 12. The penalties were also controversial because the fans, drivers, and medias wanted Hornaday's penalties harsher since Kyle Busch was parked after the Texas incident. In Hornaday's case, Rockingham is a slower circuit than Texas, where top speeds reached 200 MPH.

In 2014, the Truck Series did not return to the track due to financial struggles.

Track Enterprises, a short track promoter that promotes numerous regional races owned by Spire Sports + Entertainment, and promotes various ARCA races and the Champion Racing Association, was unable to agree with the Wisconsin State Fair with the Milwaukee Mile to host a race in Milwaukee after hosting from 2023 and 2024. Promoters moved the race to Rockingham after NASCAR's schedule released. It was held during the only off-week for the Cup Series for Easter. Tyler Ankrum won in the race's return. The following year, the defending series champion Corey Heim won the race.

On August 14, 2026, it was announced that Rockingham would be removed from the schedule.

== Past winners ==
Year	Date	No.	Driver	Team	Manufacturer	Race Distance		Race Time	Average Speed (mph)	Report	Ref
Year	Date	No.	Driver	Team	Manufacturer	Laps	Miles (km)	Race Time	Average Speed (mph)	Report	Ref
2012	April 15	4	Kasey Kahne	Turner Motorsports	Chevrolet	200	203.4 (327.340)	1:51:54	107.239	Report	
2013	April 14	30	Kyle Larson	Turner Scott Motorsports	Chevrolet	205*	208.485 (335.524)	1:59:03	103.318	Report	
2014 – 2024	Not held										
2025	April 18	18	Tyler Ankrum	McAnally–Hilgemann Racing	Chevrolet	200	188.4 (302.557)	1:49:37	102.904	Report	
2026	April 3	1	Corey Heim	Tricon Garage	Toyota	200	188.4 (302.557)	1:46:00	106.415	Report	

- 2013: Race extended due to a green–white–checker finish.

=== Multiple winners (teams) ===
# Wins	Team	Years won
2	Turner Scott Motorsports	2012, 2013
1	McAnally–Hilgemann Racing	2025
1	Tricon Garage	2026

=== Manufacturer wins ===
# Wins	Make	Years won
3	(United States) Chevrolet	2012, 2013, 2025
1	(Japan) Toyota	2026
