= Timmy Hill =

American racing driver and team owner (born 1993)

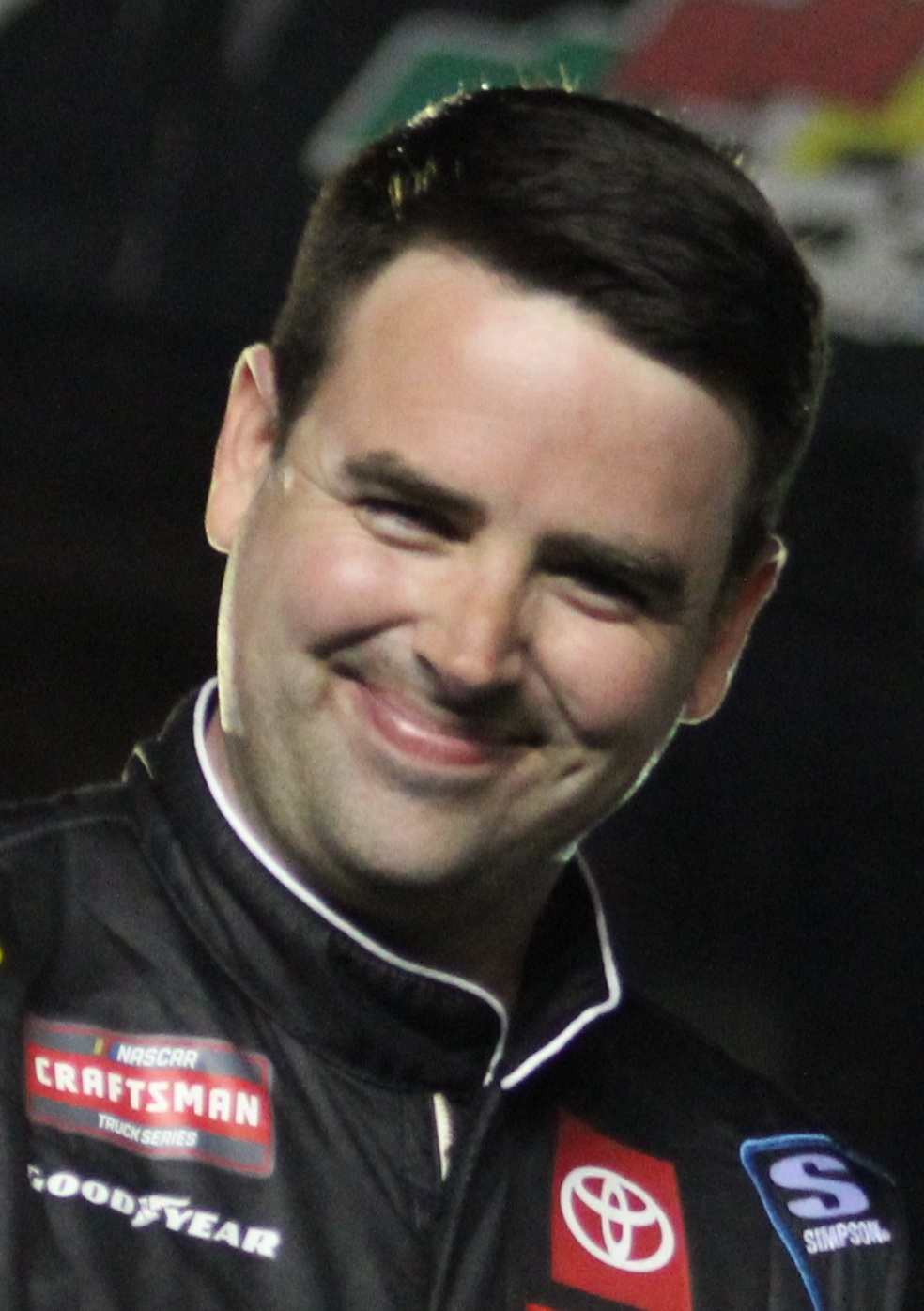
- Hill at Daytona International Speedway in 2024
- Born: Timothy Grant Hill; February 25, 1993 (age 33); Port Tobacco, Maryland, U.S.
- Achievements: 2009 Allison Legacy Series Champion
- Awards: 2011 NASCAR Nationwide Series Rookie of the Year

NASCAR Cup Series career
- 146 races run over 13 years
- 2026 position: 55th
- Best finish: 38th (2013)
- First race: 2012 Kobalt Tools 400 (Las Vegas)
- Last race: 2026 Coca-Cola 600 (Charlotte)
Wins	Top tens	Poles
0	0	0

NASCAR O'Reilly Auto Parts Series career
- 243 races run over 13 years
- 2023 position: 100th
- Best finish: 17th (2011)
- First race: 2011 Bashas' Supermarkets 200 (Phoenix)
- Last race: 2023 NASCAR Xfinity Series Championship Race (Phoenix)
Wins	Top tens	Poles
0	7	0

NASCAR FedEx Freight Truck Series career
- 133 races run over 12 years
- Truck no., team: No. 2 (Team Reaume)
- 2026 position: 28th
- Best finish: 20th (2022)
- First race: 2013 Fred's 250 (Talladega)
- Last race: 2026 Craftsman 200 (Homestead)
Wins	Top tens	Poles
0	10	0

NASCAR Canada Series career
- 1 race run over 1 year
- 2012 position: 44th
- Best finish: 44th (2012)
- First race: 2012 NAPA Autopro 100 (Montreal)
Wins	Top tens	Poles
0	1	0

ARCA Menards Series career
- 9 races run over 2 years
- Best finish: 26th (2010)
- First race: 2010 Kentuckiana Ford Dealers 200 (Salem)
- Last race: 2025 Bush's Beans 200 (Bristol)
Wins	Top tens	Poles
0	2	0

ARCA Menards Series East career
- 5 races run over 2 years
- Best finish: 18th (2025)
- First race: 2010 New Hampshire 125 (New Hampshire)
- Last race: 2025 Bush's Beans 200 (Bristol)
Wins	Top tens	Poles
0	3	0

ARCA Menards Series West career
- 2 races run over 1 year
- Best finish: 46th (2010)
- First race: 2010 King Taco 200 (Irwindale)
- Last race: 2010 3 Amigos Tequila 125 (Phoenix)
Wins	Top tens	Poles
0	1	0
- Statistics up to date as of November 8, 2026.

Timothy Grant Hill (born February 25, 1993) is an American professional stock car racing driver. He competes full-time in the NASCAR Truck Series, driving the No. 2 Ford F-150 for Team Reaume. He has previously competed in the NASCAR Cup Series, NASCAR Xfinity Series, ARCA Menards Series, ARCA Menards Series East, and NASCAR K&N Pro Series West.

Hill was born in Port Tobacco, Maryland, and began racing go-karts at the age of 12. In karting, he won two World Karting Association championships, two King George Speedway track championships, and the Concord Speedway Winter Championship. Afterward, Hill raced in Legend cars, the Allison Legacy Series, the K&N Pro Series East, and the ARCA Racing Series. In 2011, Hill moved to Rick Ware Racing in the Nationwide Series, where he won Rookie of the Year honors.

He is the son of former NASCAR driver Jerry Hill and brother of current NASCAR driver Tyler Hill, who shared driving duties in 2023 and previously co-owned the No. 56 truck for Hill Motorsports with Timmy.

== Early career ==
Hill began his racing career in 2005 by karting at the age of twelve. During his first season, he recorded more than 80 victories, as well as winning two World Karting Association championships, two King George Speedway championships, and the Concord Speedway Winter Championship. He also finished third in the World Karting Association National Championship. Once the 2005 season concluded, he began racing Bandoleros. In 2006, he scored ten wins. One year later, Hill began racing Legend cars and in the Allison Legacy Series. During the season, Hill failed to win a race. However, in 2008, he managed to win four Legend car races and two in the Allison Legacy Series. In the Allison Legacy Series, he finished fifth in the point standings.

During the 2009 season, Hill won ten Allison Legacy Series races and finished first in the point standings. In Legend cars, he won two races in the Winter Heat Series and won the Summer Shootout at Charlotte Motor Speedway. In the following year, he began racing in the ARCA Racing Series and the K&N Pro Series East while continuing racing Legend cars. In Legend cars, he won seven races, while recording two top-ten finishes in the K&N Pro Series and one in the ARCA Racing Series.

== NASCAR ==
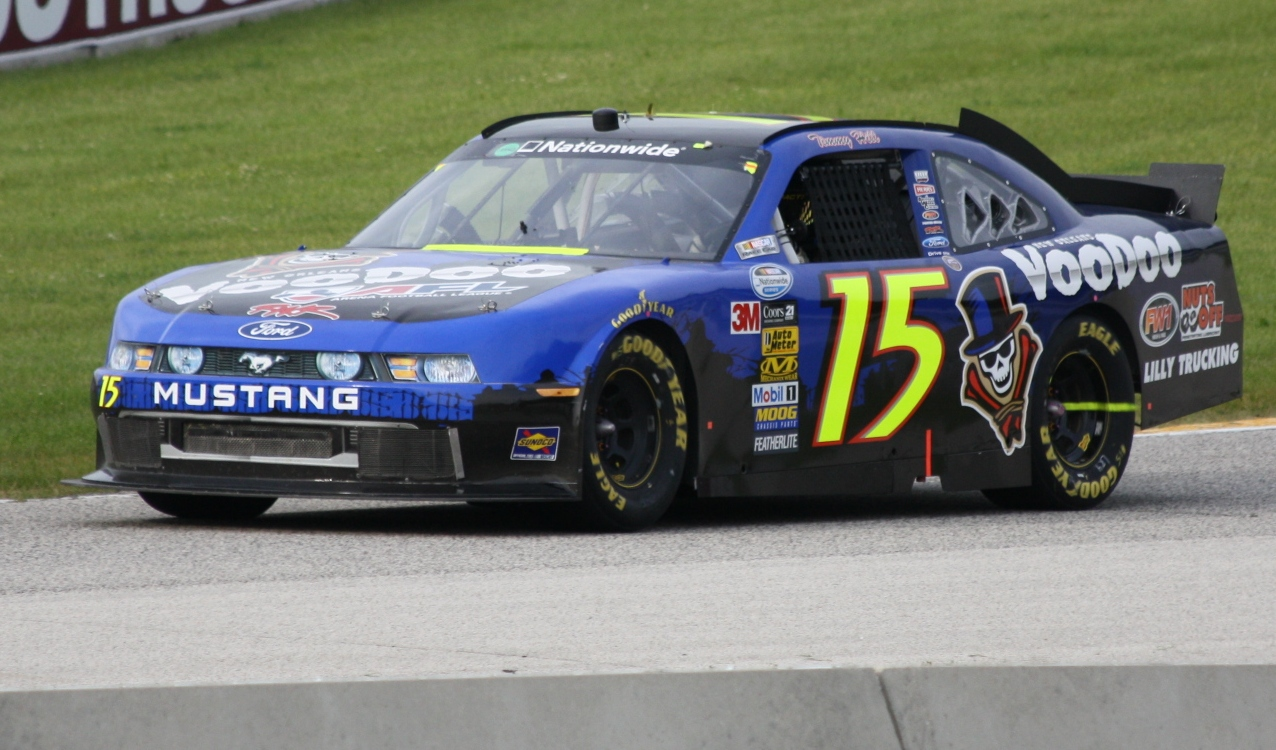
Hill's No. 15 Nationwide car for Rick Ware Racing at Road America in 2011

In 2011, Hill began racing in the NASCAR Nationwide Series at Phoenix International Raceway, having been too young to compete in the season opener at Daytona International Speedway, not yet having passed his eighteenth birthday. During the season, he had a best finish of eleventh at Road America and finished seventeenth in the point standings, winning the Rookie of the Year award. After a close battle with Blake Koch and Ryan Truex, Hill edged Koch by a single point at Homestead-Miami Speedway to take Rookie of the Year honors. He competed in 33 of the 34 events scheduled for the season, and scored top-twenty finishes in five.

Hill returned to Rick Ware Racing in NASCAR for the 2012 season, also competing for the team in the 24 Hours of Daytona. Just before the start of the season, it was announced that Hill would move up to the Sprint Cup Series, driving the No. 37 Ford for Max Q Motorsports with an alliance with Rick Ware's team, and also competing for Rookie of the Year. Hill had originally been announced to compete in all Cup races that year except for the 2012 Daytona 500, where Mike Wallace, an experienced and successful plate driver, would drive the No. 37 instead of the rookie Hill to have a better chance of getting the team in the race (which they still did not). Hill would instead be given the chance to drive at Daytona that weekend in the Nationwide race for Ware in their No. 41 car, where he would go on to score his career-best finish of seventh after avoiding a last-lap crash.

Hill would fail to qualify in his first Cup attempt at Phoenix. However, he did qualify for the following race at Las Vegas, making his series debut there. However, he would crash and finish 42nd. After a poor start to the season and only qualifying for one race (Las Vegas) in his first four races, Hill decided to return to the Nationwide Series with RWR full-time for the rest of the season. Hill would still compete in a few Cup races later in the season, with three starts in the FAS Lane Racing No. 32 and one start at Talladega in the NEMCO Motorsports No. 97.

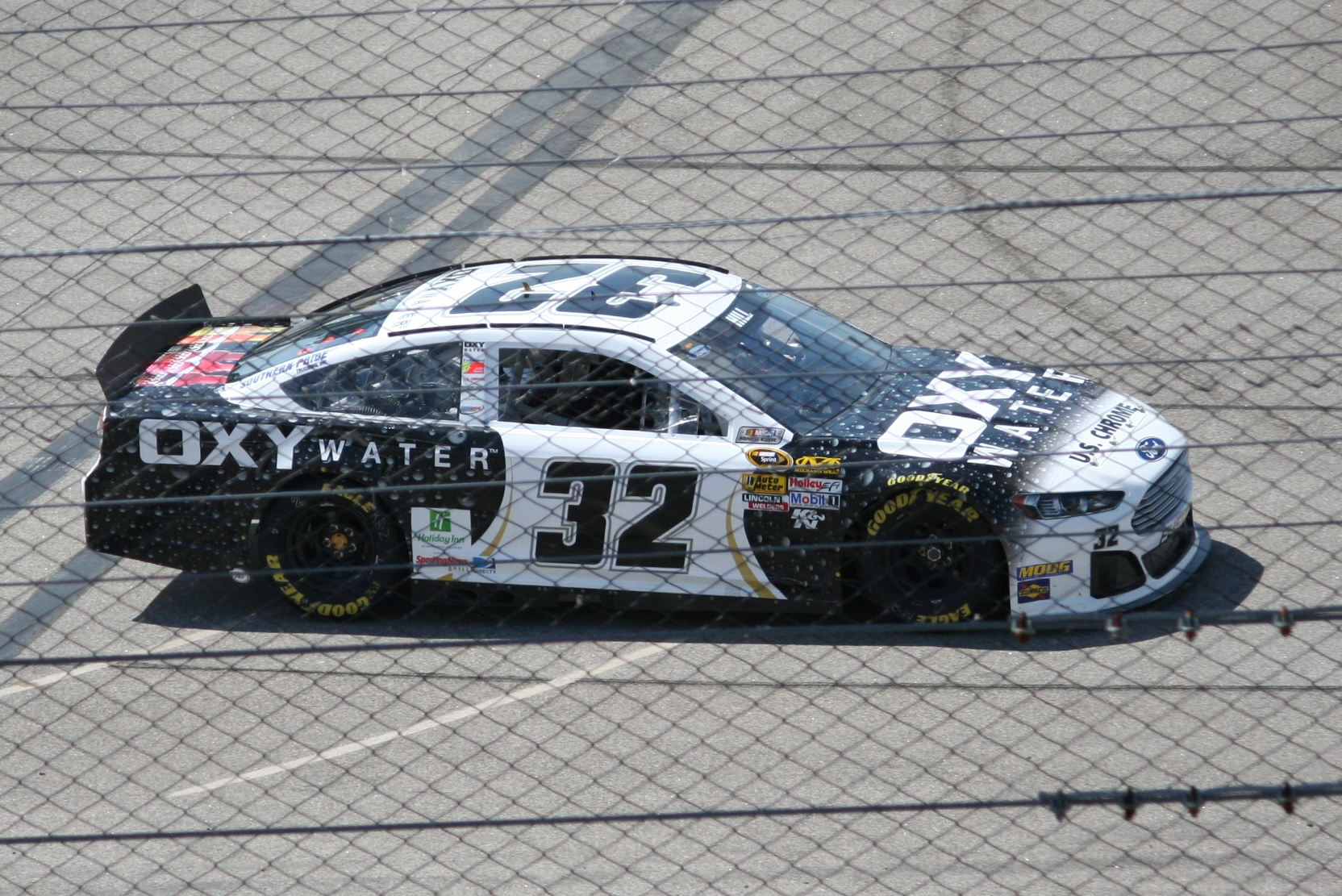
Hill's No. 32 Cup car for FAS Lane Racing at Richmond in 2013

For 2013, Hill returned to the No. 32 team for a part-time schedule of 19 races with OXY Water and U. S. Chrome sponsorship, and declared for Sprint Cup Rookie of the Year honors (again) He would finish third in the Rookie of the Year standings, behind full-time drivers Ricky Stenhouse Jr. and Danica Patrick.

Hill would drive the No. 33 Chevy part-time for Circle Sport in 2014 after starting the year without a ride after he was replaced in the No. 32 by Travis Kvapil that year. He was involved in a controversy at Bristol when, while running in last place, Hill failed to slow his car under caution and crashed into the rear of the stopped car of Matt Kenseth, who was running in second place at the time. Hill would later state that his spotter did not tell him the caution flag was out, and he did not see the safety lights around the track turn on. NASCAR on Fox analyst Darrell Waltrip famously called out Hill for a "rookie mistake" at the moment of the incident, though he recanted his harsh tone late in the broadcast. He also practiced and qualified Landon Cassill's No. 40 Circle Sport car at Sonoma when Cassill was in Road America for the Nationwide race that day. Hill would also drive in two races each for the Identity Ventures Racing and Xxxtreme Motorsports teams. IVR was a team with a limited alliance with Michael Waltrip Racing. At Pocono in June, he drove the No. 66 Toyota and would finish 36th. At New Hampshire in July, he drove the team's other car, the No. 87, to a 41st-place finish. In his two races in Xxxtreme's No. 44, Hill finished 43rd (at Dover) and 42nd (at Martinsville in October).

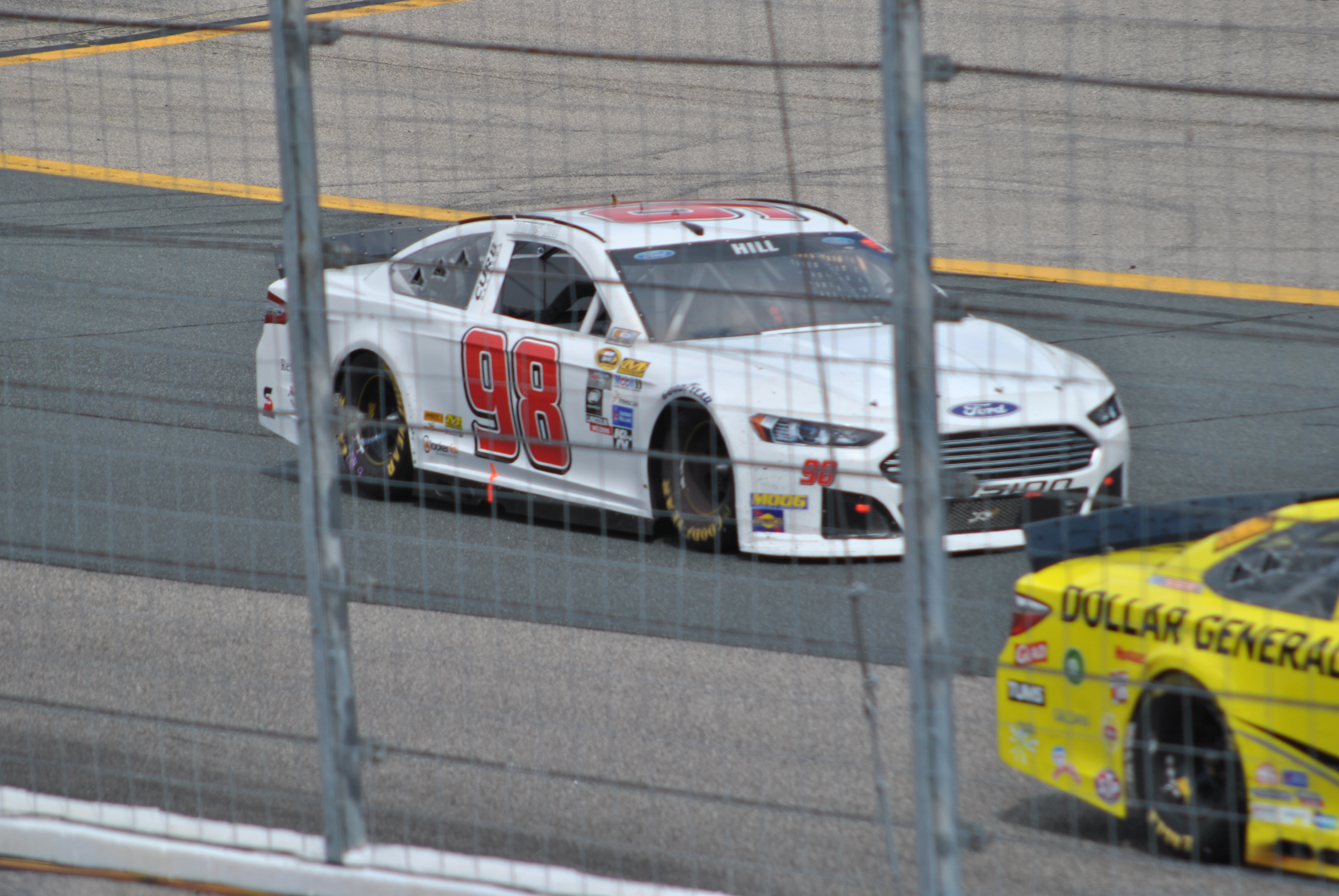
Hill's No. 98 Cup car for Premium Motorsports at New Hampshire in 2015

In 2015, Hill returned to Identity Ventures, now renamed Premium Motorsports, where he would drive part-time in both the No. 62 in the Cup Series and the No. 94 in the Truck Series, and later the No. 98 in Cup as well after they bought the Phil Parsons Racing team. He made his first Xfinity Series (previously Nationwide) start of the season at Texas in the No. 13 for Carl Long's MBM Motorsports team. Hill would make six more starts with Long, but his best finish would come in his first of three starts with JGL Racing, where he finished 11th in the No. 26 Toyota at Daytona in July. In the Truck Series, Hill would run a total of 12 races for Premium Motorsports in the No. 49 Chevy Silverado. Nine races resulted in top-20 finishes with a best finish of 15th at Dover and Kentucky. Hill's 2015 Cup debut came in the July race at Loudon. His best finish came at Pocono, where he finished 36th. Hill would go on to run eleven more races for Premium Motorsports.

Hill's 2016 season started in the season-opening Truck race at Daytona, driving the No. 49 for Premium. After running up front in the top ten for most of the race, Hill was spun out while running in the top five on the last lap, relegating him to fourteenth. As of September, Hill had run eleven Xfinity races with a best finish of 22nd at Loudon in the No. 13 for MBM. Hill announced in August that he would be running the remainder of the 2016 Xfinity Series season for MBM.

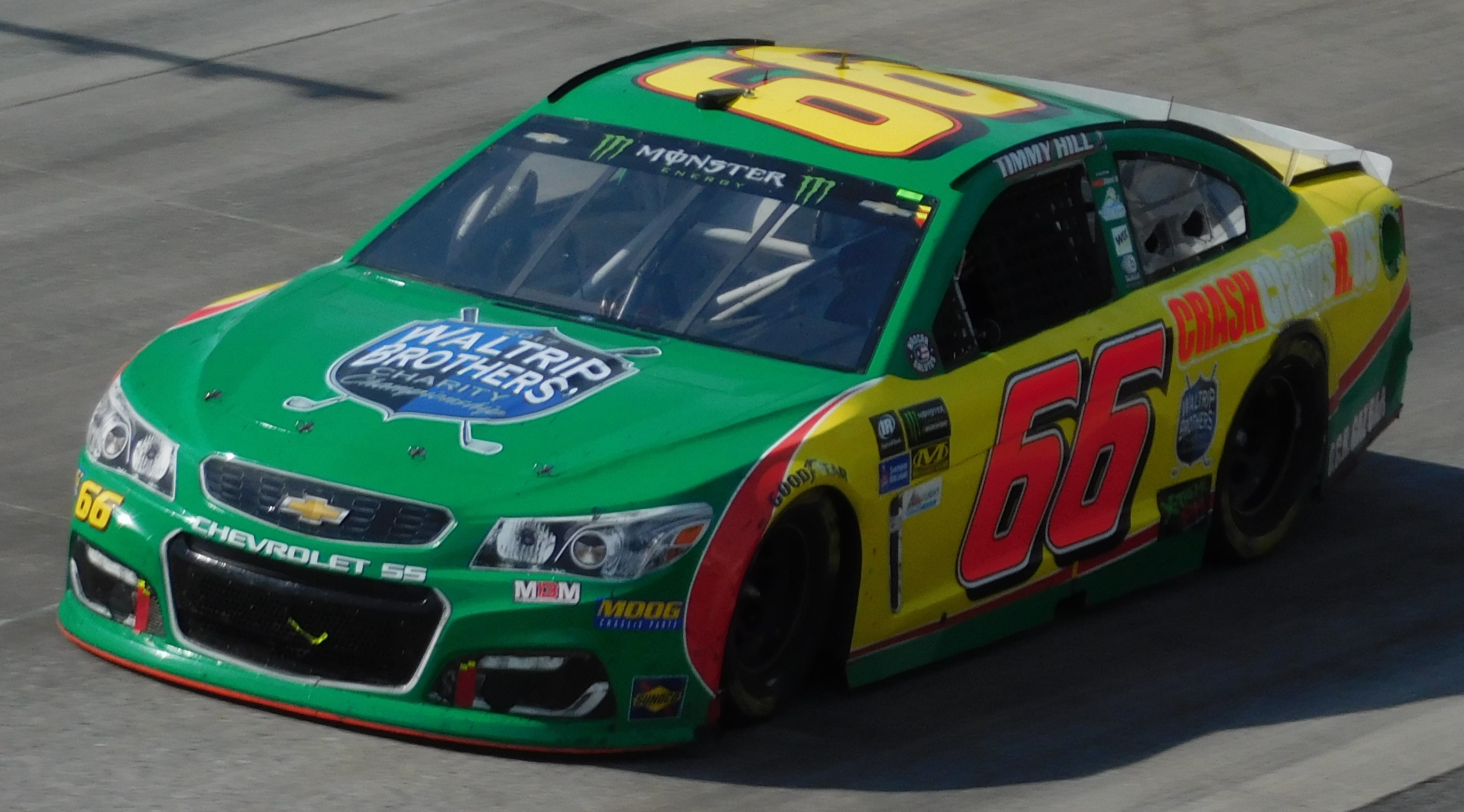
Hill's No. 66 Cup car for MBM Motorsports at Dover in 2017

In 2017, Hill returned to Rick Ware Racing to drive the No. 51 in the Cup Series starting at the Daytona 500, but failed to qualify. Starting at Dover, Hill would drive for MBM Motorsports in the No. 66 as well at Kentucky and possibly more races. At the Brickyard 400, Hill avoided numerous incidents to record his and MBM's best finish, a fourteenth.

In 2018, Hill continued to drive for MBM at multiple levels, scoring his and MBM's first top-ten, a seventh at Daytona in July. He continued with MBM in 2019, earning a seventh-place finish at Bristol in August in a car that was fielded in collaboration with Hattori Racing Enterprises. In the second Martinsville truck race of the year, the NASCAR Hall of Fame 200, Hill escaped multiple wrecks to finish fifth.

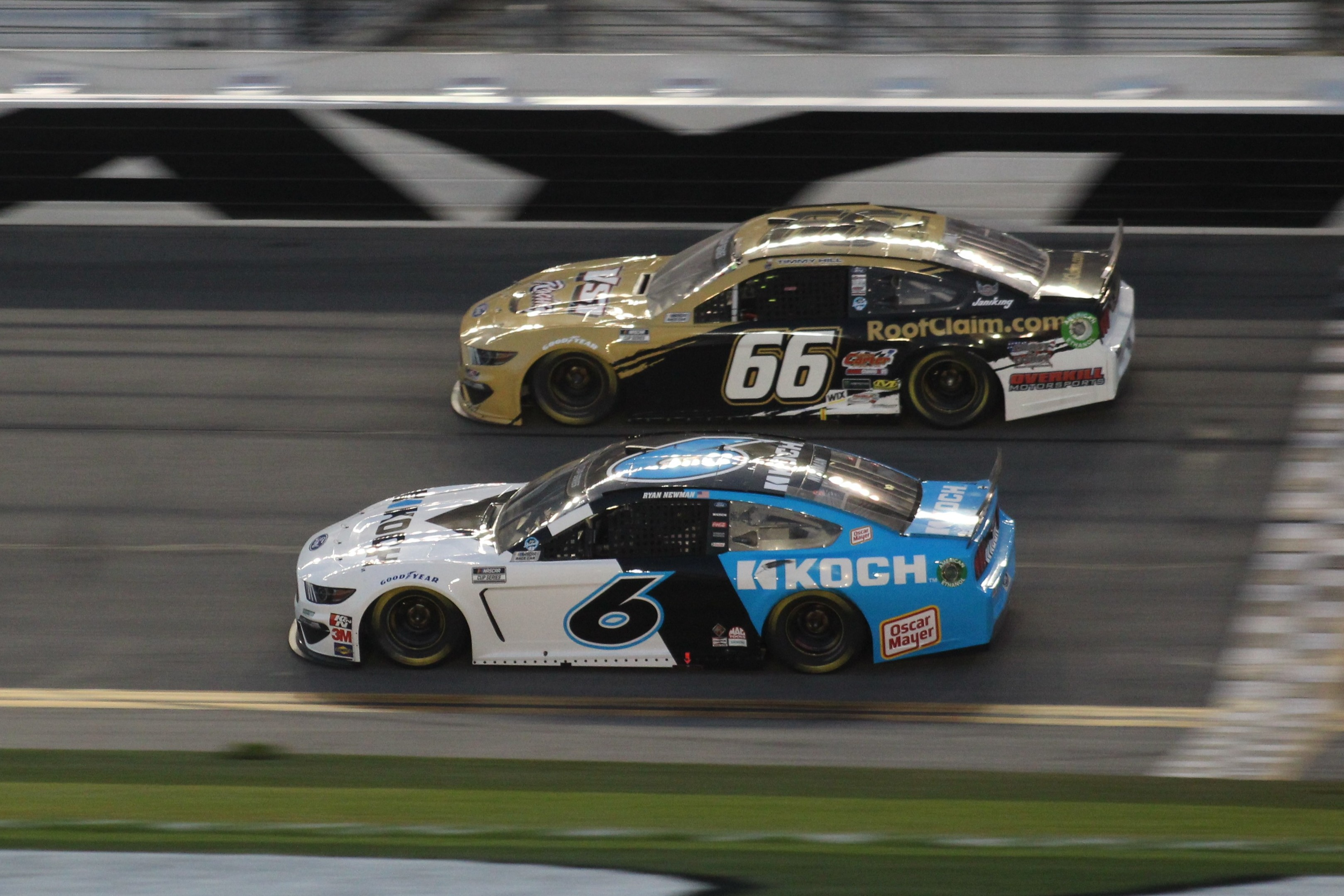
Hill in his No. 66 racing Ryan Newman in the 2020 Daytona 500. Both drivers made headlines that weekend.

Hill made the starting lineup of the 2020 Daytona 500 after finishing sixteenth in Duel 2 of the 2020 Bluegreen Vacations Duels. That same weekend, Hill's Xfinity team was assessed a $50,000 and 75-point penalty in pre-race inspection due to extra body fillers; without his now-suspended crew chief Sebastian LaForge, Hill finished third in the race, his highest career finish.

When a portion of the 2020 season was postponed due to the COVID-19 pandemic, NASCAR drivers, including Hill, competed in the eNASCAR Pro Invitational Series on iRacing. At the second race that was held, the O'Reilly Auto Parts 125 on March 29, Hill scored a win in his virtual No. 66 MBM car at the virtual Texas Motor Speedway. A veteran iRacer, Hill had competed in 1,677 events and won 673 of them, with the Texas race being his 674th.

Hill made the most NASCAR national series (Cup, Xfinity, and Truck) starts of any driver in 2020, with a total of 75 races (all 36 in Cup, 29 of 33 in Xfinity, and ten of 23 in Truck), ranking third all-time behind Kyle Busch (who accomplished this four years) and 2018 and 2019 holder Ross Chastain.

Hill got two top-twenties in 2020 (nineteenth at Bristol). The second one came at the Yellawood 500, where, due to numerous front-runners being involved in crashes, Hill ran in the top ten towards the end of the race. However, he ran out of fuel and placed fifteenth, making it his third Cup Series top twenty finish.

For 2021, MBM owner Carl Long announced in a Facebook post on December 19, 2020, that Hill would return to the team in 2021 to again run in the Cup and Xfinity Series, although he would run for Xfinity points this season. He did not end up running the full Cup schedule, only attempting fourteen of the 36 races. His Cup schedule included the 2021 Daytona 500 in the No. 66, which was a Ford in that race for the second straight year. He did not end up making the 500 in 2021 or 2022.

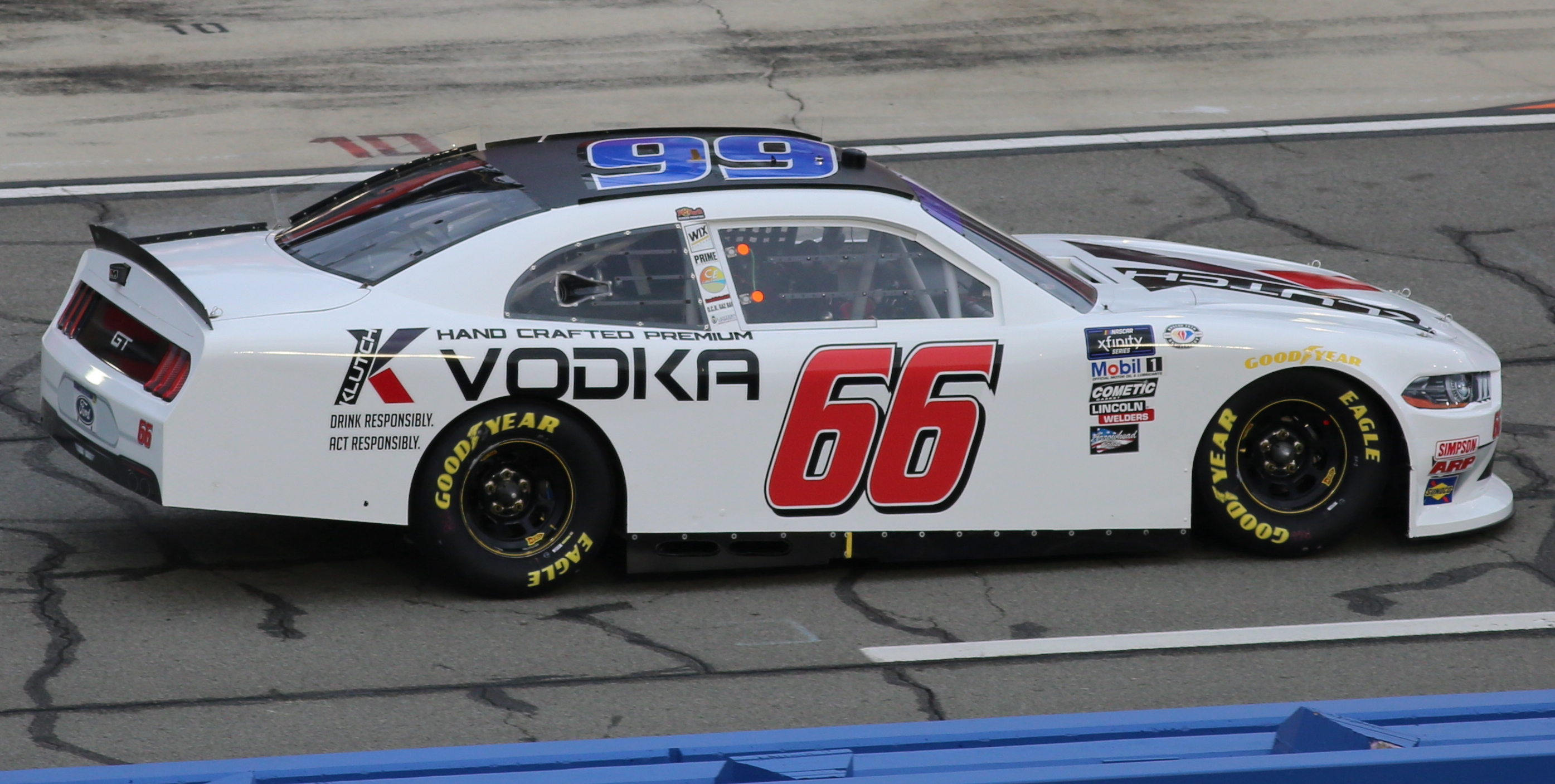
Hill at Auto Club Speedway in 2023

On August 28, 2022, during the Wawa 250, Hill achieved his and MBM's best finish in a Xfinity race by finishing second in that race, driving the No. 13 Chevrolet with sponsorship from Coble Enterprises and VSI Racing, finishing behind a race-winning Jeremy Clements.

For 2025, Hill moved to the ARCA Menards Series East to compete in the No. 56 Toyota there full-time, which would be his first time in an ARCA-sanctioned race since 2011. In the ARCA race at Bristol, Hill ran in the top 5 for much of the race until crashing with less than 25 laps to go.

On November 5, 2026, it was announced that Hill would move from the closer-Hill Motorsports to Team Reaume in 2027.

=== Team ownership ===
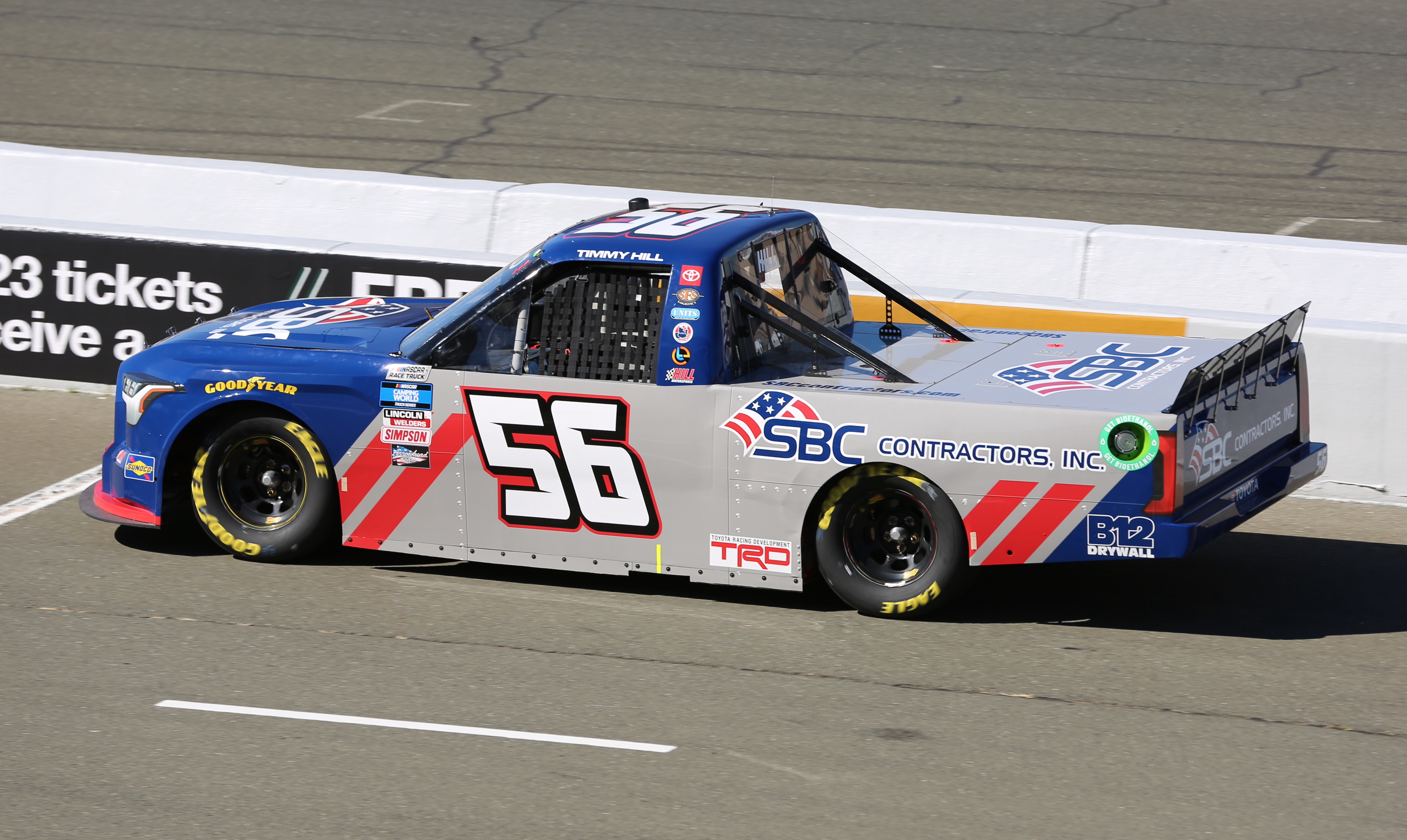
Hill's No. 56 truck at Sonoma Raceway in 2022

During the 2019 NASCAR Gander Outdoors Truck Series season, Hill formed Hill Motorsports, fielding the No. 56 Silverado part-time for himself and brother Tyler Hill; the number was used by their father Jerry during his career. The team used trucks acquired from MDM Motorsports over the 2018–2019 offseason.

The team debuted in the 2019 TruNorth Global 250 at Martinsville Speedway.

The team completed from 2019–2026, having consistent finishes. On October 30, 2026, it was announced at the race at Martinsville would be Hill's final race, driving and owning the team.

== Personal life ==
Hill became married in January 2018. His younger brother Tyler raced part-time in the ARCA Racing Series, Xfinity, and Truck Series.

He has two children named Hudson and Hoover.

== Motorsports career results ==
=== Stock car career summary ===
Season	Series	Team	Races	Wins	Top 5	Top 10	Points	Position
2010	NASCAR K&N Pro Series West	Rick Ware Racing	2	0	0	1	219	46th
2010	NASCAR K&N Pro Series East	Rick Ware Racing	1	0	0	1	134	49th
2010	ARCA Racing Series	Rick Ware Racing	3	0	0	0	1055	26th
2010	ARCA Racing Series	Mark Gibson Racing	4	0	0	1	1055	26th
2011	NASCAR Nationwide Series	Rick Ware Racing	33	0	0	0	655	17th
2012	NASCAR Canadian Tire Series	White Motorsports	1	0	0	1	37	44th
2012	NASCAR Nationwide Series	Rick Ware Racing	28	0	0	1	452	19th
2012	NASCAR Sprint Cup Series	Rick Ware Racing	1	0	0	0	0	NC†
2012	NASCAR Sprint Cup Series	NEMCO Motorsports	1	0	0	0	0	NC†
2012	NASCAR Sprint Cup Series	FAS Lane Racing	3	0	0	0	0	NC†
2013	NASCAR Camping World Truck Series	Rick Ware Racing	2	0	0	1	0	NC†
2013	NASCAR Nationwide Series	Rick Ware Racing	2	0	0	0	0	NC†
2013	NASCAR Sprint Cup Series	FAS Lane Racing	19	0	0	0	190	38th
2014	NASCAR Nationwide Series	Rick Ware Racing	6	0	0	0	0	NC†
2014	NASCAR Nationwide Series	SS-Green Light Racing	2	0	0	0	0	NC†
2014	NASCAR Sprint Cup Series	Circle Sport	6	0	0	0	62	44th
2014	NASCAR Sprint Cup Series	Identity Ventures Racing	2	0	0	0	62	44th
2014	NASCAR Sprint Cup Series	Go Fas Racing	1	0	0	0	62	44th
2014	NASCAR Sprint Cup Series	Team Xtreme Racing	2	0	0	0	62	44th
2015	NASCAR Camping World Truck Series	Premium Motorsports	12	0	0	0	297	23rd
2015	NASCAR Xfinity Series	MBM Motorsports	7	0	0	0	0	NC†
2015	NASCAR Xfinity Series	JGL Racing	3	0	0	0	0	NC†
2015	NASCAR Xfinity Series	Rick Ware Racing	1	0	0	0	0	NC†
2015	NASCAR Xfinity Series	Team Kapusta Racing	1	0	0	0	0	NC†
2015	NASCAR Sprint Cup Series	Premium Motorsports	12	0	0	0	0	NC†
2016	NASCAR Camping World Truck Series	Premium Motorsports	6	0	0	0	65	34th
2016	NASCAR Xfinity Series	Team Kapusta Racing	2	0	0	0	0	NC†
2016	NASCAR Xfinity Series	MBM Motorsports	16	0	0	0	0	NC†
2016	NASCAR Xfinity Series	B. J. McLeod Motorsports	1	0	0	0	0	NC†
2016	NASCAR Xfinity Series	Derrike Cope Racing	2	0	0	0	0	NC†
2016	NASCAR Sprint Cup Series	Premium Motorsports	1	0	0	0	0	NC†
2017	NASCAR Xfinity Series	MBM Motorsports	29	0	0	0	158	32nd
2017	Monster Energy NASCAR Cup Series	Rick Ware Racing	9	0	0	0	0	NC†
2017	Monster Energy NASCAR Cup Series	MBM Motorsports	6	0	0	0	0	NC†
2018	NASCAR Camping World Truck Series	Beaver Motorsports	1	0	0	0	0	NC†
2018	NASCAR Camping World Truck Series	NEMCO Motorsports	3	0	0	0	0	NC†
2018	NASCAR Camping World Truck Series	Copp Motorsports	1	0	0	0	0	NC†
2018	NASCAR Xfinity Series	MBM Motorsports	28	0	0	1	119	36th
2018	Monster Energy NASCAR Cup Series	Rick Ware Racing	3	0	0	0	0	NC†
2018	Monster Energy NASCAR Cup Series	MBM Motorsports	18	0	0	0	0	NC†
2019	NASCAR Gander Outdoors Truck Series	Copp Motorsports	1	0	0	0	0	NC†
2019	NASCAR Gander Outdoors Truck Series	Hill Motorsports	5	0	1	1	0	NC†
2019	NASCAR Gander Outdoors Truck Series	NEMCO Motorsports	2	0	0	0	0	NC†
2019	NASCAR Xfinity Series	MBM Motorsports	25	0	0	1	242	27th
2019	Monster Energy NASCAR Cup Series	MBM Motorsports	6	0	0	0	0	NC†
2019	Monster Energy NASCAR Cup Series	Spire Motorsports	2	0	0	0	0	NC†
2020	NASCAR Gander RV & Outdoors Truck Series	Hill Motorsports	10	0	0	2	189	26th
2020	NASCAR Xfinity Series	MBM Motorsports	29	0	1	2	0	NC†
2020	NASCAR Cup Series	MBM Motorsports	36	0	0	0	0	NC†
2021	NASCAR Camping World Truck Series	Hill Motorsports	10	0	0	3	151	27th
2021	NASCAR Xfinity Series	MBM Motorsports	14	0	0	0	0	NC†
2021	NASCAR Cup Series	MBM Motorsports	13	0	0	0	0	NC†
2022	NASCAR Camping World Truck Series	Hill Motorsports	23	0	0	0	368	20th
2022	NASCAR Xfinity Series	RSS Racing	0	0	0	0	0	NC†
2022	NASCAR Xfinity Series	MBM Motorsports	9	0	1	1	0	NC†
2022	NASCAR Cup Series	MBM Motorsports	0	0	0	0	0	NC†
2023	NASCAR Craftsman Truck Series	Hill Motorsports	14	0	0	1	222	25th
2023	NASCAR Xfinity Series	MBM Motorsports	5	0	0	0	0	NC†
2024	NASCAR Craftsman Truck Series	Hill Motorsports	22	0	0	1	349	21st
2024	NASCAR Cup Series	MBM Motorsports	2	0	0	0	0	NC†
2025	ARCA Menards Series East	Hill Motorsports	4	0	0	2	124	18th
2025	ARCA Menards Series	Hill Motorsports	2	0	0	1	63	71st
2025	NASCAR Craftsman Truck Series	Hill Motorsports	8	0	0	1	160	29th
2025	NASCAR Cup Series	Garage 66	1	0	0	0	0	NC†
2026	NASCAR Craftsman Truck Series	Hill Motorsports	13	0	0	0	165	28th
2026	NASCAR Craftsman Truck Series	Team Reaume	1	0	0	0	165	28th
2026	NASCAR Cup Series	Garage 66	2	0	0	0	0	NC†

^{†} As Hill was a guest driver, he was ineligible for championship points.

=== NASCAR ===
(key) (Bold – Pole position awarded by qualifying time. Italics – Pole position earned by points standings or practice time. * – Most laps led.)

==== Cup Series ====
NASCAR Cup Series results
Year	Team	No.	Make	1	2	3	4	5	6	7	8	9	10	11	12	13	14	15	16	17	18	19	20	21	22	23	24	25	26	27	28	29	30	31	32	33	34	35	36	NCSC	Pts	Ref
2012	Rick Ware Racing	37	Ford	DAY	PHO; DNQ	LVS; 42	BRI; DNQ	CAL; DNQ	MAR	TEX	KAN	RCH	TAL	DAR	CLT	DOV	POC	MCH	SON	KEN	DAY	NHA	IND	POC	GLN	MCH	BRI	ATL	RCH	CHI	NHA	DOV								63rd	0^{2}	
2012	NEMCO Motorsports	97	Toyota																														TAL; 42							63rd	0^{2}	
2012	FAS Lane Racing	32	Ford																															CLT; 36	KAN; 22	MAR	TEX	PHO; 29	HOM	63rd	0^{2}	
2013	FAS Lane Racing	32	Ford	DAY	PHO	LVS	BRI	CAL; 39	MAR	TEX; 36	KAN; 33	RCH; 34	TAL	DAR; 33	CLT; 27	DOV; 35	POC; 35	MCH	SON	KEN	DAY	NHA	IND; 42	POC; 27	GLN	MCH; 29	BRI	ATL; 31	RCH	CHI; 34	NHA; 36	DOV; 36	KAN; 28	CLT; 36	TAL	MAR	TEX; 41	PHO; 34	HOM	38th	190	
2014	Circle Sport	33	Chevy	DAY	PHO	LVS; 38	BRI; 43	CAL	MAR	TEX	DAR	RCH	TAL	KAN; 40	CLT	DOV																	KAN; 33	CLT; 36	TAL		TEX; 35	PHO	HOM	44th	62	
2014	Identity Ventures Racing	66	Toyota														POC; 36	MCH																						44th	62	
2014	Hillman Racing	40	Chevy																SON; QL^{‡}	KEN	DAY																			44th	62	
2014	Identity Ventures Racing	87	Toyota																			NHA; 41	IND	POC	GLN	MCH	BRI	ATL	RCH	CHI										44th	62	
2014	Go FAS Racing	32	Ford																												NHA; 35									44th	62	
2014	Team Xtreme Racing	44	Chevy																													DOV; 43				MAR; 42				44th	62	
2015	Premium Motorsports	98	Ford	DAY	ATL	LVS	PHO	CAL	MAR	TEX	BRI	RCH	TAL	KAN	CLT	DOV	POC	MCH	SON	DAY	KEN	NHA; 38	IND; 41				BRI; 39													71st	0^{1}	
2015	Premium Motorsports	62	Ford																					POC; 36							NHA; 36				TAL; 41					71st	0^{1}	
2015	Premium Motorsports	98	Chevy																						GLN; 38	MCH; 43														71st	0^{1}	
2015	Premium Motorsports	62	Chevy																									DAR; DNQ	RCH; DNQ	CHI; 41		DOV; 39	CLT; DNQ	KAN; DNQ		MAR; 36	TEX	PHO; 43	HOM	71st	0^{1}	
2016	Premium Motorsports	98	Chevy	DAY	ATL	LVS	PHO	CAL	MAR	TEX	BRI	RCH	TAL	KAN	DOV	CLT	POC	MCH	SON	DAY	KEN	NHA	IND	POC	GLN	BRI	MCH	DAR	RCH	CHI	NHA	DOV; 34	CLT	KAN	TAL	MAR	TEX	PHO	HOM	59th	0^{1}	
2017	Rick Ware Racing	51	Chevy	DAY; DNQ	ATL	LVS; 37	PHO; 32	CAL; 35	MAR; 33	TEX; 39	BRI; 37	RCH; 34	TAL	KAN; 28	CLT; 29																									52nd	0^{1}	
2017	MBM Motorsports	66	Chevy													DOV; 28	POC	MCH	SON	DAY	KEN; 31	NHA	IND; 14	POC	GLN	MCH	BRI; DNQ	DAR; RL^{‡}	RCH	CHI; 39	NHA	DOV; 40	CLT; 33	TAL	KAN	MAR	TEX	PHO	HOM	52nd	0^{1}	
2018	Rick Ware Racing	51	Chevy	DAY	ATL	LVS	PHO; 33						TAL; 36	DOV																										66th	0^{1}	
2018	Rick Ware Racing	51	Toyota					CAL; 33	MAR	TEX	BRI	RCH																												66th	0^{1}	
2018	MBM Motorsports	66	Toyota												KAN; 32	CLT; 32	POC	MCH; 35	SON	CHI; 39	DAY	KEN; 34	NHA	POC; 36	GLN		BRI; 28	DAR; 37	IND; 35	LVS; 33	RCH; 39	ROV; 38	DOV; 39	TAL	KAN; 40	MAR; 38	TEX; DNQ	PHO; 39	HOM; 37	66th	0^{1}	
2018	MBM Motorsports	66	Chevy																							MCH; 37														66th	0^{1}	
2019	MBM Motorsports	66	Toyota	DAY	ATL	LVS	PHO	CAL	MAR	TEX; 38	BRI; 35	RCH	TAL	DOV	KAN; 39	CLT	POC	MCH	SON	CHI	DAY	KEN	NHA	POC	GLN	MCH	BRI	DAR	IND	LVS	RCH	ROV; 30	DOV	TAL			TEX; 37	PHO	HOM; 33	59th	0^{1}	
2019	Spire Motorsports	77	Chevy																																KAN; 39	MAR; 34				59th	0^{1}	
2020	MBM Motorsports	66	Ford	DAY; 27																														TAL; 15						42nd	0^{1}	
2020	MBM Motorsports	66	Toyota		LVS; 38	CAL; 37	PHO; 38	DAR; 33	DAR; 33	CLT; 34	CLT; 33	BRI; 19	ATL; 39	MAR; 39	HOM; 34	TAL; 33	POC; 35	POC; 29	IND; 29	KEN; 37	TEX; 36	KAN; 38	NHA; 33	MCH; 33	MCH; 35	DRC; 29	DOV; 34	DOV; 36	DAY; 24	DAR; 35	RCH; 38	BRI; 37	LVS; 37		ROV; 38	KAN; 34	TEX; 30	MAR; 29	PHO; 36	42nd	0^{1}	
2021	MBM Motorsports	66	Ford	DAY; DNQ									TAL; 29	KAN	DAR	DOV	COA	CLT	SON	NSH																				61st	0^{1}	
2021	MBM Motorsports	66	Toyota		DRC; 29	HOM; 38	LVS; 36	PHO; 38	ATL; 36	BRD	MAR	RCH									POC; 35	POC; 37	ROA	ATL	NHA	GLN	IRC; 27	MCH	DAY	DAR	RCH	BRI	LVS	TAL	ROV; 32			MAR; 37	PHO; 38	61st	0^{1}	
2021	MBM Motorsports	13	Toyota																																	TEX; 27	KAN			61st	0^{1}	
2022	MBM Motorsports	66	Ford	DAY; DNQ	CAL	LVS	PHO	ATL	COA	RCH	MAR	BRD	TAL	DOV	DAR	KAN	CLT	GTW	SON	NSH	ROA	ATL	NHA	POC	IRC	MCH	RCH	GLN	DAY	DAR	KAN	BRI	TEX	TAL	ROV	LVS	HOM	MAR	PHO	63rd	–	
2024	MBM Motorsports	66	Ford	DAY	ATL	LVS	PHO	BRI	COA; 36	RCH	MAR	TEX	TAL	DOV	KAN	DAR	CLT	GTW	SON	IOW	NHA	NSH	CSC	POC	IND	RCH	MCH	DAY	DAR; 35	ATL	GLN	BRI	KAN	TAL	ROV	LVS	HOM	MAR	PHO	59th	0^{1}	
2025	Garage 66	66	Ford	DAY	ATL	COA	PHO	LVS	HOM	MAR	DAR	BRI	TAL	TEX	KAN	CLT	NSH	MCH	MXC	POC	ATL	CSC	SON	DOV	IND	IOW	GLN	RCH	DAY	DAR; 35	GTW	BRI	NHA	KAN	ROV	LVS	TAL	MAR	PHO	59th	0^{1}	
2026	Garage 66	66	Ford	DAY	ATL	COA	PHO	LVS	DAR; 37	MAR	BRI	KAN	TAL	TEX	GLN	CLT; 36	NSH	MCH	POC	COR	SON	CHI	ATL	NWS	IND	IOW	RCH	NHA	DAY	DAR	GTW	BRI	KAN	LVS	CLT	PHO	TAL	MAR	HOM	55th	0^{1}	
^{†} – Qualified for Landon Cassill · ^{‡} – Relieved Carl Long

===== Daytona 500 =====
Year	Team	Manufacturer	Start	Finish
2017	Rick Ware Racing	Chevrolet	DNQ	
2020	MBM Motorsports	Ford	32	27
2021	MBM Motorsports	Ford	DNQ	
2022	MBM Motorsports	Ford	DNQ	

==== Xfinity Series ====
NASCAR Xfinity Series results
Year	Team	No.	Make	1	2	3	4	5	6	7	8	9	10	11	12	13	14	15	16	17	18	19	20	21	22	23	24	25	26	27	28	29	30	31	32	33	34	NXSC	Pts	Ref
2011	Rick Ware Racing	15	Ford	DAY	PHO; 29	LVS; 24	BRI; 29	CAL; 32	TEX; 28	TAL; 14	NSH; 33	RCH; 26	DAR; 19	DOV; 22	IOW; 30	CLT; 23	CHI; 15	MCH; 27	ROA; 11	DAY; 23	KEN; 26	NHA; 23	NSH; 22	IRP; 23	IOW; 21	GLN; 31	CGV; 22	BRI; 22	ATL; 36	RCH; 17	CHI; 22	DOV; 22	KAN; 34	CLT; 21	TEX; 33	PHO; 18	HOM; 21	17th	655	
2012	Rick Ware Racing	15	Ford	DAY; 7	PHO	LVS	BRI	CAL																			ATL; 33		CHI; 33					TEX; DNQ		HOM; DNQ		19th	452^{2}	
2012	Rick Ware Racing	41	Ford						TEX; 28	RCH; 26	TAL; 21	DAR; 16	IOW; 25	CLT; 19	DOV; 31	MCH; 26	ROA; 22	KEN; 32		NHA; 21	CHI; 18	IND; 23	IOW; 30	GLN; 35	CGV; 36			RCH; 31		KEN; 29	DOV; 24	CLT; 33						19th	452^{2}	
2012	Rick Ware Racing	41	Chevy																DAY; 9																			19th	452^{2}	
2012	Rick Ware Racing	15	Chevy																							BRI; 25												19th	452^{2}	
2012	Rick Ware Racing	71	Ford																														KAN; 38					19th	452^{2}	
2012	Rick Ware Racing	75	Ford																															TEX; 39				19th	452^{2}	
2012	Rick Ware Racing	70	Chevy																																PHO; 27			19th	452^{2}	
2013	Rick Ware Racing	23	Chevy	DAY	PHO	LVS	BRI	CAL	TEX	RCH	TAL	DAR	CLT	DOV	IOW	MCH	ROA	KEN	DAY	NHA	CHI	IND	IOW	GLN	MOH	BRI	ATL	RCH	CHI	KEN	DOV	KAN	CLT	TEX	PHO; 23	HOM; 23		122nd	0^{1}	
2014	Rick Ware Racing	23	Chevy	DAY	PHO	LVS	BRI; 21	CAL	TEX	DAR	RCH	TAL	IOW	CLT	DOV; 21	MCH	ROA	KEN	DAY	NHA	CHI	IND	IOW	GLN							DOV; 25	KAN; 39						110th	0^{1}	
2014	SS-Green Light Racing	55	Chevy																						MOH; 37													110th	0^{1}	
2014	Rick Ware Racing	87	Chevy																							BRI; 34	ATL	RCH	CHI	KEN			CLT; 34	TEX	PHO	HOM		110th	0^{1}	
2015	MBM Motorsports	13	Dodge	DAY	ATL	LVS	PHO	CAL	TEX; 35						DOV; 31	MCH	CHI																					96th	0^{1}	
2015	MBM Motorsports	13	Toyota							BRI; 34	RCH; 38	TAL	IOW																									96th	0^{1}	
2015	MBM Motorsports	40	Toyota											CLT; 39																								96th	0^{1}	
2015	JGL Racing	26	Toyota															DAY; 11	KEN; 24	NHA	IND; 27	IOW	GLN	MOH	BRI	ROA	DAR	RCH	CHI	KEN								96th	0^{1}	
2015	Rick Ware Racing	17	Chevy																												DOV; 35							96th	0^{1}	
2015	MBM Motorsports	40	Chevy																													CLT; 39	KAN; 37	TEX				96th	0^{1}	
2015	Team Kapusta Racing	56	Chevy																																PHO; 27	HOM		96th	0^{1}	
2016	Team Kapusta Racing	25	Chevy	DAY	ATL	LVS	PHO; 32	CAL	TEX					CLT; 33	POC	MCH																						116th	0^{1}	
2016	MBM Motorsports	13	Dodge							BRI; 32	RCH; 31	TAL	DOV; 26						NHA; 22																			116th	0^{1}	
2016	B. J. McLeod Motorsports	15	Ford														IOW; 35	DAY																				116th	0^{1}	
2016	MBM Motorsports	40	Dodge																	IND; 39							RCH; 39											116th	0^{1}	
2016	MBM Motorsports	40	Toyota																		IOW; 37	GLN		BRI; DNQ		DAR; 36					CLT; 40	KAN; 40	TEX; 38	PHO; 39	HOM; 39			116th	0^{1}	
2016	Derrike Cope Racing	70	Chevy																				MOH; 29		ROA; 23													116th	0^{1}	
2016	MBM Motorsports	13	Toyota																									CHI; 25	KEN; 34									116th	0^{1}	
2016	MBM Motorsports	72	Dodge																										KEN; DNQ									116th	0^{1}	
2016	MBM Motorsports	40	Chevy																											DOV; 38								116th	0^{1}	
2017	MBM Motorsports	40	Toyota	DAY	ATL; 33	LVS; 33																																32nd	158	
2017	MBM Motorsports	40	Dodge				PHO; 26			BRI; 24		TAL; 17					IOW; 28	DAY; 17		NHA; 28							DAR; 32											32nd	158	
2017	MBM Motorsports	13	Chevy					CAL; 30																							DOV; 33							32nd	158	
2017	MBM Motorsports	40	Chevy						TEX; 31		RCH; 28				POC; 30																			TEX; 30	PHO; 28			32nd	158	
2017	MBM Motorsports	13	Toyota										CLT; 38	DOV; 39		MCH; 39			KEN; 38		IND; 36	IOW																32nd	158	
2017	MBM Motorsports	13	Dodge																				GLN; 37	MOH	BRI; 36	ROA		RCH; 38	CHI; 36	KEN; 36		CLT; 35	KAN; 36			HOM; 37		32nd	158	
2018	MBM Motorsports	66	Toyota	DAY; DNQ								TAL; 27							DAY; 7												ROV; 32							36th	119	
2018	MBM Motorsports	66	Dodge		ATL; 34	LVS; 33		CAL; 35	TEX; 36	BRI; 27	RCH; 38				POC; 39	MCH; 31				KEN; 37			GLN; 36	MOH					LVS; 34			DOV; 27						36th	119	
2018	MBM Motorsports	66	Chevy				PHO; 34							CLT; 30																								36th	119	
2018	MBM Motorsports	13	Toyota										DOV; 35				IOW; 37	CHI; 37			NHA; 38	IOW			BRI; 38			IND; DNQ		RCH; 38			KAN; 31	TEX; 35	PHO	HOM; 35		36th	119	
2018	MBM Motorsports	13	Dodge																							ROA; 35												36th	119	
2018	MBM Motorsports	72	Toyota																								DAR; 35											36th	119	
2019	MBM Motorsports	66	Toyota	DAY; 19	ATL; 28	LVS; 23	PHO	CAL; 34		BRI; 17		TAL; 29	DOV; 16	CLT; 35	POC; 19			CHI; 34	DAY; 20	KEN; 37	NHA; 34						DAR; 23	IND	LVS	RCH	ROV; 18	DOV; 27						27th	242	
2019	MBM Motorsports	13	Toyota						TEX; 37		RCH; 37					MCH; 31	IOW; 36					IOW; 35	GLN										KAN; DNQ	TEX; 35	PHO	HOM; 34		27th	242	
2019	MBM Motorsports	42	Toyota																					MOH; 27														27th	242	
2019	MBM Motorsports	61	Toyota																						BRI; 7	ROA; RL^{†}												27th	242	
2020	MBM Motorsports	66	Toyota	DAY; 3					CLT; 34														DOV; 36	DOV; 34			RCH; 36	RCH; 36			TAL; 14	ROV; 19						75th	0^{1}	
2020	MBM Motorsports	61	Toyota		LVS; 26	CAL	PHO; 23	DAR; 22		BRI; 14	ATL; 33	HOM; 23	HOM; 25	TAL; 26	POC; 8		KEN; 21	KEN; 26	TEX; 17	KAN; 19	ROA	DRC			DAY; 22	DAR												75th	0^{1}	
2020	MBM Motorsports	13	Toyota													IRC; 19													BRI; 15	LVS; 28			KAN; 22	TEX; 36	MAR; 17	PHO; 23		75th	0^{1}	
2021	MBM Motorsports	66	Ford	DAY; 20							TAL; 13	DAR; 23															DAR; 36											90th	0^{3}	
2021	MBM Motorsports	66	Toyota		DRC; 34	HOM; 16	LVS; 37	PHO; 14	ATL; 20	MAR; 30			DOV; 30	COA; 33	CLT; 34																							90th	0^{3}	
2021	MBM Motorsports	13	Toyota													MOH; DNQ	TEX; DNQ	NSH; DNQ	POC; DNQ		ATL; DNQ	NHA			MCH; DNQ	DAY; DNQ		RCH; DNQ	BRI; DNQ	LVS; DNQ	TAL; DNQ	ROV; DNQ	TEX; DNQ	KAN; DNQ	MAR; DNQ			90th	0^{3}	
2021	MBM Motorsports	42	Toyota																	ROA; 20																		90th	0^{3}	
2021	MBM Motorsports	66	Chevy																				GLN; 29	IRC														90th	0^{3}	
2021	MBM Motorsports	61	Toyota																																	PHO; DNQ		90th	0^{3}	
2022	RSS Racing	38	Ford	DAY	CAL; QL^{‡}	LVS	PHO	ATL	COA	RCH	MAR	TAL	DOV																									78th	0^{1}	
2022	MBM Motorsports	13	Toyota											DAR; 33	TEX; 27	CLT; 38	PIR	NSH	ROA	ATL	NHA	POC; 30	IRC	MCH								ROV; 28	LVS					78th	0^{1}	
2022	MBM Motorsports	66	Chevy																						GLN; 14													78th	0^{1}	
2022	MBM Motorsports	13	Chevy																							DAY; 2	DAR	KAN	BRI	TEX	TAL; 27							78th	0^{1}	
2022	MBM Motorsports	13	Ford																															HOM; 29	MAR	PHO		78th	0^{1}	
2023	MBM Motorsports	13	Toyota	DAY; DNQ																																		100th	0^{1}	
2023	MBM Motorsports	66	Ford		CAL; 32	LVS	PHO; DNQ	ATL	COA	RCH	MAR	TAL	DOV; 30	DAR														DAR; 32	KAN; QL^{±}							PHO; 30		100th	0^{1}	
2023	MBM Motorsports	66	Toyota												CLT; DNQ	PIR	SON	NSH	CSC	ATL	NHA	POC; DNQ	ROA	MCH	IRC	GLN	DAY			BRI; 38	TEX	ROV	LVS	HOM	MAR; DNQ			100th	0^{1}	
^{†} – Relieved Dick Karth · ^{‡} – Qualified but replaced by Joe Graf Jr. · ^{±} – Qualified but replaced by Leland Honeyman

==== Truck Series ====
NASCAR Truck Series results
Year	Team	No.	Make	1	2	3	4	5	6	7	8	9	10	11	12	13	14	15	16	17	18	19	20	21	22	23	24	25	NTSC	Pts	Ref
2013	Rick Ware Racing	1	Chevy	DAY	MAR	CAR	KAN	CLT	DOV	TEX	KEN	IOW	ELD	POC	MCH	BRI	MSP	IOW	CHI	LVS	TAL; 6								91st	0^{1}	
2013	Rick Ware Racing	81	Chevy																			MAR; 31	TEX	PHO	HOM				91st	0^{1}	
2015	Premium Motorsports	94	Chevy	DAY	ATL	MAR	KAN	CLT	DOV; 15	TEX; 23	GTW; 18	IOW; 18	KEN; 15	ELD	POC	MCH	BRI	MSP	CHI; 18	NHA; 20	LVS	TAL; 20	MAR; 26	TEX; 20	PHO; 18	HOM; 21			23rd	297	
2016	Premium Motorsports	49	Chevy	DAY; 14	ATL; 21	MAR; 23	KAN; 21	DOV	CLT; 31	TEX	IOW	GTW	KEN; 23	ELD	POC	BRI	MCH	MSP	CHI	NHA	LVS	TAL	MAR	TEX	PHO	HOM			34th	65	
2018	Beaver Motorsports	50	Chevy	DAY	ATL	LVS	MAR	DOV	KAN	CLT; 28	TEX	IOW	GTW	CHI	KEN; DNQ	ELD													107th	0^{1}	
2018	NEMCO Motorsports	87	Chevy														POC; 28							TEX; 31	PHO	HOM			107th	0^{1}	
2018	Copp Motorsports	63	Chevy															MCH; 32	BRI	MSP	LVS	TAL	MAR						107th	0^{1}	
2019	Copp Motorsports	63	Chevy	DAY	ATL; 31	LVS																							98th	0^{1}	
2019	Hill Motorsports	56	Chevy				MAR; 21				CLT; 16	TEX	IOW	GTW	CHI; 24	KEN	POC	ELD	MCH	BRI; 17	MSP	LVS	TAL	MAR; 5	PHO	HOM			98th	0^{1}	
2019	NEMCO Motorsports	87	Chevy					TEX; 26	DOV	KAN; 28																			98th	0^{1}	
2020	Hill Motorsports	56	Chevy	DAY	LVS; 28	CLT; 22	ATL; 22	HOM	POC	KEN	TEX; 18	KAN; 19	KAN	MCH	DRC	DOV; 21	GTW	DAR; 9	RCH; 9	BRI; 20	LVS	TAL	KAN	TEX	MAR; 14	PHO			26th	189	
2021	Hill Motorsports	56	Chevy	DAY	DRC; 9	LVS	ATL	BRD	RCH; 21	KAN; 22	DAR; 7	COA; 24	CLT; 18	TEX	NSH; 29	POC	KNX	GLN; 24	GTW	DAR	BRI; 17	LVS	TAL	MAR; 10	PHO				27th	151^{3}	
2022	Hill Motorsports	56	Toyota	DAY; 14	LVS; 18	ATL; 22	COA; 22	MAR; 23	BRD; 23	DAR; 16	KAN; 27	TEX; 20	CLT; 21	GTW; 17	SON; 28	KNX; 19	NSH; 23	MOH; 17	POC; 28	IRP; 17	RCH; 31	KAN; 19	BRI; 26	TAL; 15	HOM; 20	PHO; 27			20th	368	
2023	Hill Motorsports	56	Toyota	DAY; 16	LVS; 22	ATL; 8	COA; 25	TEX	BRD; 25	MAR; 19	KAN	DAR; 24	NWS; 31	CLT	GTW; 18	NSH; 16	MOH; 21	POC	RCH; 23	IRP	MLW	KAN; 24	BRI; 26	TAL	HOM	PHO			25th	222	
2024	Hill Motorsports	56	Toyota	DAY; 8	ATL; 18	LVS; 32	BRI; 24	COA; 17	MAR; 20	TEX; 21	KAN; 22	DAR; 13	NWS; 26	CLT; 22	GTW; 18	NSH; 27	POC; 23	IRP; 19	RCH; 19	MLW; 25	BRI; 22	KAN; 23	TAL; DNQ	HOM; 23	MAR; 21	PHO; 22			21st	349	
2025	Hill Motorsports	56	Toyota	DAY; 11	ATL	LVS	HOM	MAR	BRI	CAR; 21	TEX	KAN	NWS	CLT; 19	NSH	MCH	POC	LRP; 25	IRP	GLN; 20	RCH	DAR; 8	BRI	NHA	ROV; 16	TAL	MAR; 16	PHO	29th	160	
2026	Hill Motorsports	56	Toyota	DAY; DNQ	ATL	STP; 32	DAR; 14	CAR; 30	BRI; 33	TEX	GLN; 27	DOV	CLT; 18	NSH	MCH	COR; Wth	LRP	NWS; DNQ	IRP; 19	RCH; 33	NHA; 29	BRI; 22	KAN	CLT; 32	PHO	TAL; 16	MAR; 31		28th	165	
2026	Team Reaume	2	Ford																									HOM; 17	28th	165	
2027	Team Reaume	2	Ford	DAY	ATL	STP	DAR	BRI	TEX	KAN	NWS	CLT	NSH	POC	MCH	LRP	ATL	IRP	BRI	BGS	MSP	NHA	KAN	CLT	PHO	TAL	MAR	HOM			

^{*} Season still in progress
^{1} Ineligible for series points
^{2} Hill started the 2012 season running for Cup points but switched to the Nationwide Series starting at Texas in April.
^{3} Hill started the 2021 season running for Xfinity points but switched to the Truck Series starting at Darlington in May.

==== Canadian Tire Series ====
NASCAR Canadian Tire Series results
Year	Team	No.	Make	1	2	3	4	5	6	7	8	9	10	11	12	NCTSC	Pts	Ref
2012	White Motorsports	10	Dodge	MSP	ICAR	MSP	DEL	MPS	EDM	SAS	CTR	CGV; 6	BAR	RIS	KWA	44th	37	

=== ARCA Menards Series ===
(key) (Bold – Pole position awarded by qualifying time. Italics – Pole position earned by points standings or practice time. * – Most laps led.)

ARCA Menards Series results
Year	Team	No.	Make	1	2	3	4	5	6	7	8	9	10	11	12	13	14	15	16	17	18	19	20	AMSC	Pts	Ref
2010	Rick Ware Racing	47	Chevy	DAY	PBE	SLM; 19	TEX	TAL	TOL	POC	MCH	IOW; 19	MFD	POC									CAR; 18	26th	1055	
2010	Mark Gibson Racing	59	Dodge												BLN; 14	NJE; 14	ISF	CHI	DSF	TOL; 10	SLM; 17	KAN		26th	1055	
2025	Hill Motorsports	56	Toyota	DAY	PHO	TAL	KAN	CLT	MCH	BLN	ELK	LRP	DOV; 6	IRP	IOW	GLN	ISF	MAD	DSF	BRI; 19	SLM	KAN	TOL	71st	63	

==== ARCA Menards Series East ====
ARCA Menards Series East results
Year	Team	No.	Make	1	2	3	4	5	6	7	8	9	10	AMSEC	Pts	Ref
2010	Rick Ware Racing	99	Chevy	GRE	SBO	IOW	MAR	NHA	LRP	LEE	JFC	NHA; 10	DOV	49th	134	
2025	Hill Motorsports	56	Toyota	FIF; 7	CAR; 20	NSV	FRS	DOV; 6	IRP	IOW	BRI; 19			18th	124	

==== K&N Pro Series West ====
NASCAR K&N Pro Series West results
Year	Team	No.	Make	1	2	3	4	5	6	7	8	9	10	11	12	NKNPSWC	Pts	Ref
2010	Rick Ware Racing	99	Chevy	AAS	PHO	IOW	DCS	SON	IRW; 7	PIR	MRP	CNS	MMP	AAS	PHO; 30	46th	219	

=== 24 Hours of Daytona ===
(key)

24 Hours of Daytona results
Year	Class	No	Team	Car	Co-drivers	Laps	Position	Class Pos.
2012	GT	15	(United States) Rick Ware Racing	Ford Mustang	(United States) Chris Cook (United States) Jeffrey Earnhardt (United States) Doug Harrington (United States) John Ware	256	51 ^{DNF}	38 ^{DNF}

Sporting positions
Preceded by Austin Hogue	Allison Legacy Series Champion; 2009	Succeeded by Justin Allison
Achievements
Preceded by Ricky Stenhouse Jr.	NASCAR Nationwide Series Rookie of the Year; 2011	Succeeded by Austin Dillon
