= NASCAR Truck Series at Talladega Superspeedway =

NASCAR Truck Series race at Talladega Superspeedway

Love's RV Stop 225

NASCAR Truck Series
- Venue: Talladega Superspeedway
- Location: Lincoln, Alabama, United States
- Corporate sponsor: Love's Travel Stops
- First race: 2006
- Distance: 226.1 miles (363.9 km)
- Laps: 85; Stages 1/2: 20 each Final stage: 45
- Previous names: John Deere 250 (2006); Mountain Dew 250 (2007–2010); Coca-Cola 250 Powered by Fred's (2011); Fred's 250 (2012–2017); Fr8Auctions 250 (2018); Sugarlands Shine 250 (2019); Chevrolet Silverado 250 (2020–2022); Love's RV Stop 250 (2023)
- Most wins (driver): Timothy Peters (3)
- Most wins (team): Red Horse Racing (3)
- Most wins (manufacturer): Toyota (11)

Circuit information
- Surface: Asphalt
- Length: 2.66 mi (4.28 km)
- Turns: 4

The Love's RV Stop 225 is a NASCAR Truck Series race that takes place at Talladega Superspeedway in Lincoln, Alabama. The race has been in The Chase ever since the addition of it to the Truck Series schedule. Sammy Smith is the defending winner, having won the event in 2026.

== History ==
The race was first held on October 7, 2006, as the John Deere 250. The race was won by future NASCAR Hall of Famer Mark Martin. In 2007, Mountain Dew would become the race sponsor and the race would be known as the Mountain Dew 250.

The 2009 running of the race would make history for multiple reasons. For the first time in NASCAR National Series event, a father-daughter combo was set to race. Mike Wallace was joined on the entry list by his daughter, Chrissy Wallace. While Chrissy had run Truck Series events in the past, this was the first time her father would be one of the competitors.

The race has had various title sponsors, such as Fr8Auctions, Sugarlands Shine, Chevrolet to promote their Silverado truck, and Love's RV Stop. In 2024, the race kept the same sponsor but the distance was reduced from 250 to 225 miles and was run on a Friday afternoon.

=== Close finishes ===
The race has been known to have many close finishes. In 2007, Todd Bodine would edge out Rick Crawford by 0.014 seconds, the 9th closest finish. In 2010, after a muli-wreck incident, Kyle Busch won by 0.002 seconds over Aric Almirola. This would be the second closest finish in series history. In 2019, Spencer Boyd would beat Todd Gilliland by 0.027 seconds, the 17th closest finish. In the 2021 event, Tate Fogleman would hold off Tyler Hill to get the 28th closest finish. In 2024, the race would end up being the 23rd closest finish when Grant Enfinger would hold off Taylor Gray near the end of the race.

== Past winners ==
Year	Date	No.	Driver	Team	Manufacturer	Race Distance		Race Time	Average Speed (mph)	Report	Ref
Year	Date	No.	Driver	Team	Manufacturer	Laps	Miles (km)	Race Time	Average Speed (mph)	Report	Ref
2006	October 7	6	Mark Martin	Roush Racing	Ford	94	250.04 (402.4)	1:48:33	138.207	Report	
2007	October 6	30	Todd Bodine	Germain Racing	Toyota	94	250.04 (402.4)	1:55:25	129.985	Report	
2008	October 4	30	Todd Bodine	Germain Racing	Toyota	94	250.04 (402.4)	1:43:06	145.513	Report	
2009	October 31	51	Kyle Busch	Billy Ballew Motorsports	Toyota	98*	260.68 (419.523)	2:02:21	127.837	Report	
2010	October 30	18	Kyle Busch	Kyle Busch Motorsports	Toyota	95*	252.7 (406.681)	1:48:51	139.293	Report	
2011	October 22	33	Mike Wallace	Kevin Harvick Inc.	Chevrolet	94	250.04 (402.4)	1:57:41	127.481	Report	
2012	October 6	7	Parker Kligerman	Red Horse Racing	Toyota	94	250.04 (402.4)	1:56:26	128.85	Report	
2013	October 19	98	Johnny Sauter	ThorSport Racing	Toyota	94	250.04 (402.4)	2:02:09	122.819	Report	
2014	October 18	17	Timothy Peters	Red Horse Racing	Toyota	95*	252.7 (406.681)	1:54:19	132.632	Report	
2015	October 24	17	Timothy Peters	Red Horse Racing	Toyota	98*	260.68 (419.523)	2:00:16	130.051	Report	
2016	October 22	24	Grant Enfinger	GMS Racing	Chevrolet	94	250.04 (402.4)	2:05:54	119.161	Report	
2017	October 14	75	Parker Kligerman	Henderson Motorsports	Toyota	95*	252.7 (406.681)	1:57:18	129.258	Report	
2018	October 13	25	Timothy Peters	GMS Racing	Chevrolet	94	250.04 (402.4)	1:48:47	137.911	Report	
2019	October 12	20	Spencer Boyd	Young's Motorsports	Chevrolet	98*	260.68 (419.523)	2:07:21	122.817	Report	
2020	October 3	4	Raphaël Lessard	Kyle Busch Motorsports	Toyota	94	250.04 (402.4)	1:55:55	129.424	Report	
2021	October 2	12	Tate Fogleman	Young's Motorsports	Chevrolet	99*	263.34 (423.72)	2:06:17	125.119	Report	
2022	October 1	25	Matt DiBenedetto	Rackley W.A.R.	Chevrolet	95*	252.7 (406.681)	2:12:40	114.286	Report	
2023	September 30	34	Brett Moffitt	Front Row Motorsports	Ford	99*	263.34 (423.72)	2:26:07	108.136	Report	
2024	October 4	9	Grant Enfinger	CR7 Motorsports	Chevrolet	85	226.1 (363.9)	1:48:24	125.148	Report	
2025	October 17	17	Gio Ruggiero	Tricon Garage	Toyota	90*	239.4 (385.305)	2:00:27	119.253	Report	
2026	October 23	7	Sammy Smith	Spire Motorsports	Chevrolet	86*	228.76 (368.15)	1:54:10	120.224	Report	
2027	October 29									Report	

- 2009–2010, 2014–2015, 2017, 2019, 2021–2023, 2025, and 2026: The race was extended due to a NASCAR Overtime finish.

=== Multiple winners (drivers) ===
# Wins	Driver	Years won
3	Timothy Peters	2014, 2015, 2018
2	Todd Bodine	2007, 2008
2	Kyle Busch	2009, 2010
2	Parker Kligerman	2012, 2017
2	Grant Enfinger	2016, 2024

=== Multiple winners (teams) ===
# Wins	Team	Years won
3	Red Horse Racing	2012, 2014, 2015
2	Germain Racing	2007, 2008
2	GMS Racing	2016, 2018
2	Kyle Busch Motorsports	2010, 2020
2	Young's Motorsports	2019, 2021

=== Manufacturer wins ===
# Wins	Make	Years won
11	(Japan) Toyota	2007-2010, 2012-2015, 2017, 2020, 2025
8	(United States) Chevrolet	2011, 2016, 2018, 2019, 2021, 2022, 2024, 2026
2	(United States) Ford	2006, 2023

Previous race: Zero Carbon Bioethanol 150 Powered by POET	NASCAR Truck Series; Love's RV Stop 225	Next race: Black's Tire 200
