= Darlington Raceway =

Motorsport track in the United States

The Lady in Black The Track Too Tough To Tame

- Oval (1953–present)
- Location: 1301 Harry Byrd Highway; Darlington, South Carolina, United States; 29532
- Coordinates: 34°17′44.23″N 79°54′21.46″W
- Capacity: 47,000
- Owner: NASCAR (2019–present); International Speedway Corporation (1982–2018)
- Broke ground: Disputed; December 12, 1949; 76 years ago, or January 13, 1950; 76 years ago
- Opened: August 19, 1950; 76 years ago
- Major events: Current: NASCAR Cup Series; Southern 500 (1950–present); Goodyear 400 (1952, 1957–2004, 2020–present); NASCAR O'Reilly Auto Parts Series; Sport Clips Haircuts VFW 200 (1982, 1984–2014, 2020–present); Darlington 200 (1983–2024, 2026); NASCAR Truck Series; Sober or Slammer 200 (2001–2004, 2010–2011, 2020–present); In It To Win It 200 (2021); Former: AAA/USAC Champ Car Racing (1950–1951, 1954, 1956); International Race of Champions (1993–1995)
- Website: darlingtonraceway.com

Oval (1953–present)
- Surface: Asphalt
- Length: 1.366 mi (2.198 km)
- Turns: 4
- Banking: Turns 1 and 2: 25° Turns 3 and 4: 23° Frontstretch and Backstretch: 6°
- Race lap record: 0:28.332 ( (United States) Denny Hamlin, Toyota Camry, 2018, NASCAR Cup)

Darlington Raceway is a 1.366 mi (2.198 km) egg-shaped oval track in Darlington, South Carolina, United States. The track has hosted racing events since its inaugural season in 1950, primarily races sanctioned by NASCAR. The venue has a capacity of 47,000 as of 2021. Darlington Raceway is owned by NASCAR and led by track president Josh Harris.

Darlington Raceway opened in 1950 under Darlington native Harold Brasington, who sought to replicate the success of the Indianapolis Motor Speedway and the Indianapolis 500 in his hometown. Brasington quickly cut all ties with the facility, with Bob Colvin taking over control of the venue as president of the track. Colvin expanded and improved the speedway, but this work ended unfinished when he died in 1967, and the track's lack of amenities were criticized. The International Speedway Corporation (ISC) bought the facility in 1982 and expanded it in the 1990s. The track has remained a staple of the NASCAR Cup Series since its beginning years despite Darlington's small market and NASCAR's national expansion; the Southern 500 is considered among the schedule's most prestigious races.

== Description ==
=== Configuration ===
Darlington Raceway in its current form is measured at 1.366 mi (2.198 km), with 25° of banking in the track's first two turns, 23° of banking in the track's last two turns, and 6° of banking on the track's straights. The track is known for its asymmetrical layout, with the first two turns having a wider radius than the last two turns. Due to numerous factors, including an unusually highly abrasive track surface, its asymmetrical shape, and the track's preferred racing line of being near the wall, the track has often been regarded by NASCAR drivers as one of the toughest circuits on the NASCAR schedule, with teams often sacrificing performance in one set of turns to run better in the other set of turns.

=== Amenities ===
Darlington Raceway is located in Darlington, South Carolina, and is served by U.S. Route 52 and the concurrent South Carolina Highway 34 and South Carolina Highway 151. As of 2021, the venue has a capacity of 47,000 according to The State.

== Track history ==
=== Planning and construction ===
After witnessing the 1933 Indianapolis 500 in-person, Darlington, South Carolina, resident Harold Brasington was interested in rekindling the success of the Indianapolis 500 in the American Southeast with stock car racing. After searching in numerous locations in Virginia, Tennessee, and Atlanta, he settled to buy lands in his hometown due to lower land prices. After 15 years of owning a trucking business, Brasington was able to gather enough money and agreed on a handshake deal to build a stock car track on a 105-acre (42 ha) plot of land owned by J. S. Ramsey, a personal friend of Brasington. The date of the beginning of construction for the venue is disputed: in a 1950 report published by the Columbia Record, Darlington Raceway general engineer Paul Psilios stated that construction started on January 13, 1950. However, according to numerous Carolinan newspapers decades after the venue's opening, construction started sometime in 1949, with Charlotte News writer Bob Myers stating that groundbreaking occurred on December 12. Darlington Raceway, according to multiple South Carolinian newspapers, was placed under heavy speculation and doubt, with the facility reportedly earning the derogatory nickname "Harold's Folly" by the local populace.

After grading for then-turns 3 and 4 were completed, Ramsey became worried about the track potentially destroying a fishing pond that he often fished in after witnessing the fast-paced construction of the venue. In response, Brasington opted to make the radius of then-turns 1 and 2 tighter than then-turns 3 and 4. In February 1950, The Charlotte News' Rubye Arnold reported that the facility would host a 500-mile (800 km) race on Labor Day of that year. By April, grading on the facility was 50% complete. A month later, with a newly-elected slate of board of directors being appointed, a completion date of August 1 was announced. On July 1, surfacing of the track started. By the completion of the then-named Darlington International Raceway, it had a seating capacity of approximately 10,000, with the 1.25-mile (2.01 km) track drawing comparisons to the Indianapolis Motor Speedway in terms of prestige.

=== Early Colvin years ===
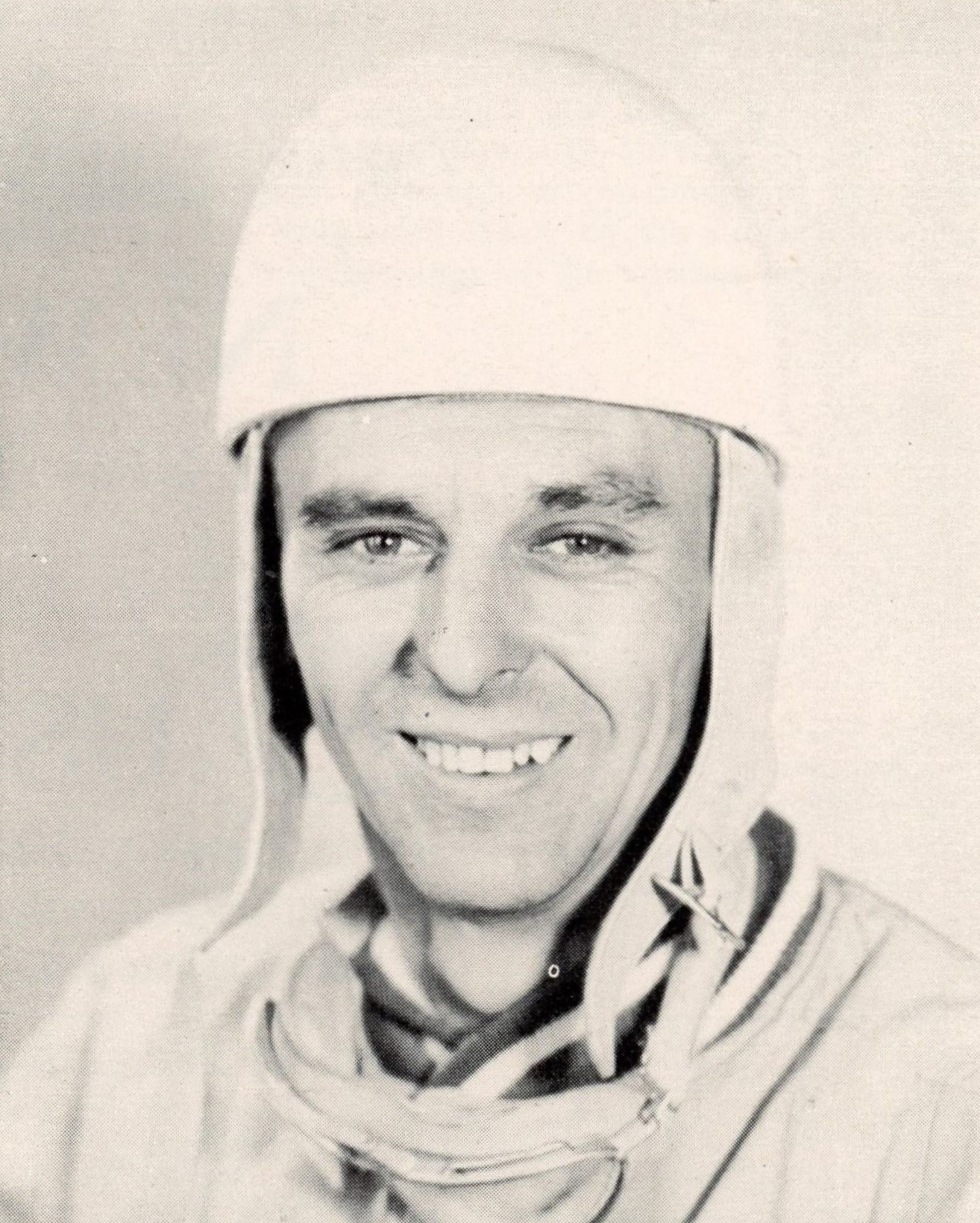
Johnny Mantz (pictured in 1957) won the first race at Darlington Raceway.

Darlington International Raceway officially opened to the public on August 19, 1950, for qualifying races for the 1950 Southern 500. The Southern 500, the venue's first major race, took place on September 4, with Johnny Mantz winning the event. In November, the facility ran its first motorcycle races for Armistice Day weekend. The following year, Bob Colvin was appointed to replace Brasington as president of the track, with Brasington eventually cutting all ties with the facility four years later.

Under Colvin's leadership, the venue was expanded extensively; in 1953, the track's "south turn" banking was extended from 12 ft (3.7 m) to 26 ft (7.9 m). The installation of lights for the 1953 Southern 500 was also considered; however, the proposal was rejected due to impracticality and a lack of fan support. The following year, the venue added 6,000 grandstand seats, increasing the grandstand capacity to 16,000 according to Colvin. A new 13,200-seat grandstand located on the backstretch to increase grandstand capacity to 29,200 was announced in 1955; by the time it was completed in 1956, the grandstand was expanded to include 14,500 seats. Another 3,300-seat grandstand named after Confederate Army general Robert E. Lee was erected in 1963 on the track's then-fourth turn. In 1965, the track was completely repaved for the first time.

Numerous drivers died at Darlington in its early years. The first, Robert Burns, died after crashing in a November 1950 motorcycle race. Two years later, Rex Stansell crashed during a modified and sportsman race and died of a head injury. In 1954, Bob Scott broke his neck and died after crashing during a 200 mi (320 km) race. In the 1957 Southern 500, Bobby Myers was killed when his car hit the standstill car of Fonty Flock and flipped several times; he died of a broken neck and "a crushed chest and massive hemorrhaging," according to the Florence Morning News. In the 1960 Southern 500, the track experienced its deadliest incident, when Bobby Johns' car crashed and flipped on the track's backstretch pit road, killing three people: NASCAR official Joe Brown Taylor alongside Paul McDuffie and Charles Ernest Sweatland, both members of Joe Lee Johnson's pit crew. In the 1965 Southern 500, Buren Skeen died of "head and abdominal injuries" related to a crash when Reb Wickersham's car slammed into the driver's side of Skeen's car.

==== Colvin's segregationist policies and Confederacy support ====
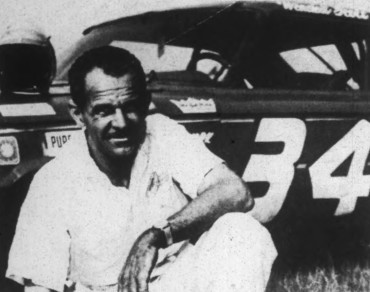
Early longtime track president Bob Colvin was known for his segregationist policies at Darlington Raceway, affecting black spectators and black drivers, including driver Wendell Scott (pictured in 1970).

Colvin was also known for implementing racially segregated policies at the venue during his tenure: grandstand seating remained all-white, with Colvin refusing to allow any black spectators into the grandstands and instead either offering refunds or a ticket to the track's infield if a black spectator was caught having a grandstand ticket, according to a 1960 Morning News report. He also refused to let any black driver to race at the circuit for most of his tenure; early black NASCAR driver Wendell Scott was barred from racing at the track for most of his career.

After Colvin let Scott race in the 1965 Rebel 300, the driver asked the course owner for him for travel money that the white drivers received. Colvin told Scott, "Nigger, you better git yo' ass back up that road [sic]."

According to the track's then-official photographer Tom Kirkland, Colvin said that if he saw any black driver win at the track, they would "never make it to victory lane", with Kirkland adding, "he was just a complete racist". Under Colvin's tenure, the track's marquee events, the Southern 500 and Rebel 400, were openly promoted as celebrations of the Confederacy.

=== Slow Wallace years ===
On January 24, 1967, Colvin died after suffering a heart attack in his home. Barney Wallace was elected the track's general manager six days later, and about four months after that, was elected to replace Colvin as president. Wallace was slow to upgrade and maintain the facility. NASCAR writer Steve Waid described Wallace as a "totally colorless man...He didn't care to spend a dime unless it was absolutely necessary". In 1969, then-turns three and four were reconfigured from 15° to 25° and widened to 31 ft (9.4 m). Within the year, upgrades were also made to the facility's press box alongside the installation of a new concrete wall in then-turns one and two. Four years later, a $100,000 (adjusted for inflaton, $725,262) renovation of the track's garage area was announced. In 1975, the track was fully enclosed with a concrete wall. Another complete repave of the track was ordered and completed three years later. In 1982, the then-frontstretch grandstand was renamed to the Colvin Grandstand in honor of Bob Colvin. The following year, 2,157 seats were added to the venue.

=== ISC purchase ===
In March 1982, Darlington Raceway was reported to have been suffering "significant revenue losses" according to The News & Observer. The following month, United Press International released rumors of offers of a potential sale, including from California businessman Warner W. Hodgdon and motorsports businessman Harry Ranier. On June 11, 1982, a sale to the France family-owned International Speedway Corporation (ISC) was announced, with the company offering to buy out control at $70 a share. The sale was approved on the 28th by the track's board of directors, with Wallace remaining as president. Wallace's tenure under ISC was short; he died on May 10, 1983, due to cancer. 20 days later, vice president Walter "Red" Tyler was selected to replace Wallace as president of Darlington Raceway. In 1985, the inside retaining pit wall on the then-frontstretch was demolished and replaced with a newer, longer pit wall by 712 ft (217 m). Four years later, Tyler was replaced by Woodrow "Woody" McKay as president.

In 1990, a major multi-year renovation project commenced. Within the first year, a new garage area was constructed alongside the demolition of the old then-backstretch box seats. However, the project was heavily delayed starting in 1991 due to economic issues. The following year, NASCAR's president for administration and marketing, Jim Hunter, was selected to replace McKay as president starting in 1993. In 1994, the project continued with the new 8,000-seat Tyler Tower named in honor of Red Tyler being erected above the then-backstretch Wallace Grandstand, with future plans being made to expand the tower. The following year, the track was completely repaved alongside the venue adding 5,000 seats. In 1997, the start-finish line was "flip-flopped" from the frontstretch to the backstretch, in the process swapping the turn numbers; turns one and two became turns three and four, and vice versa. An additional 7,700-seat grandstand was constructed within the year, alongside upgrades to the venue's victory lane and a new media center. In 1999, the frontstretch pit road was extended by seven pit boxes, in the process removing the backstretch pit road, condensing from two pit roads to one singular pit road.

==== Ferko lawsuit, rescheduling of Southern 500 ====
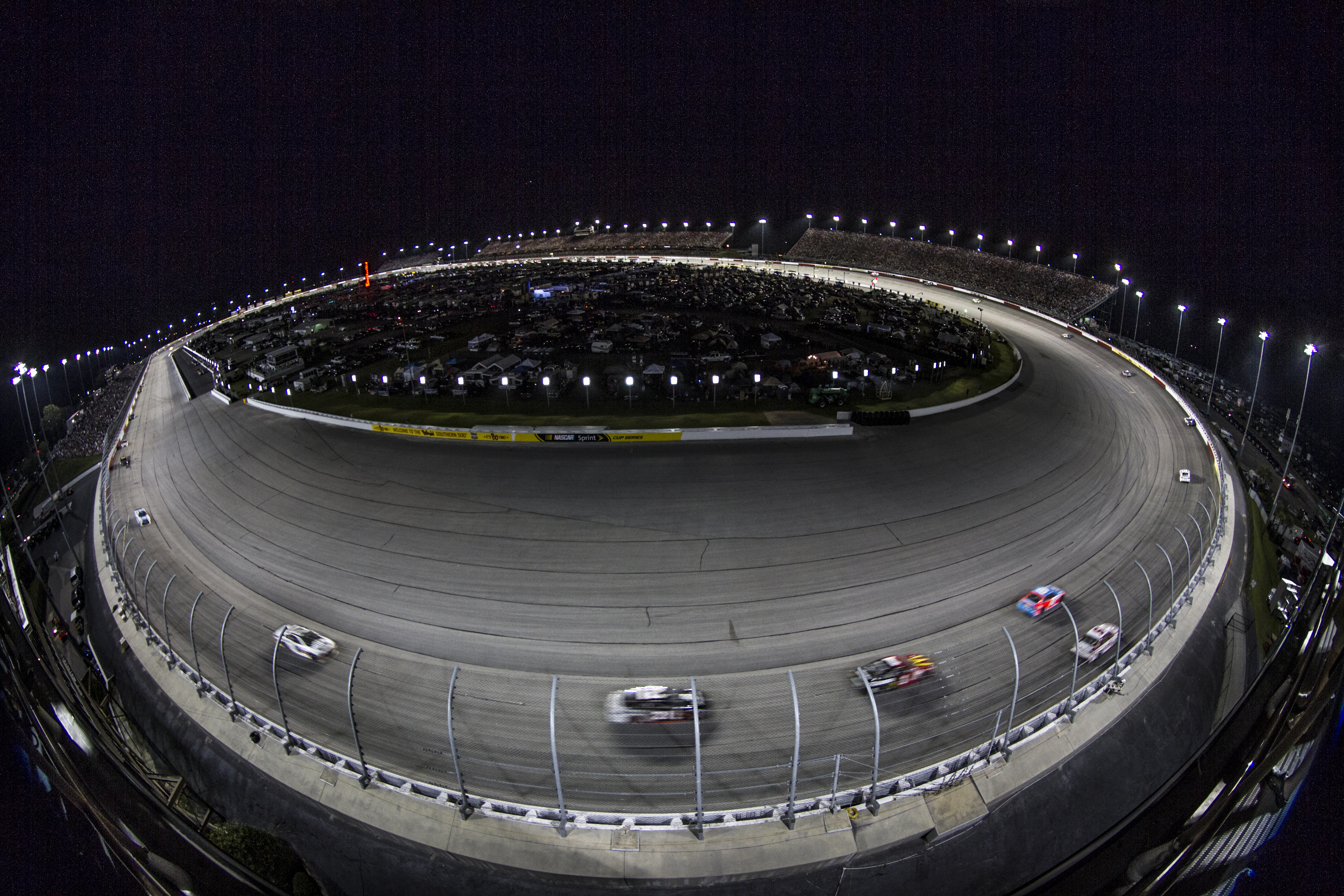
Night racing at Darlington Raceway in 2015. In 2004, the venue added permanent lighting to host night racing at the track.

In March 2001, Hunter was replaced by ISC executive Andrew Gurtis as president of the venue. In 2003, after a previous failed attempt to do so in 1999, track officials announced the addition of permanent lighting to host night racing at the venue. The following year, the addition of soft wall SAFER barriers was announced; both features were added to the track in time for the 2004 Mountain Dew Southern 500. In May 2004, after NASCAR's focus on national expansion and the aftermath of the Ferko lawsuit involving a minority Speedway Motorsports, Inc. (SMI) shareholder suing NASCAR and ISC for violating an implied agreement to give Texas Motor Speedway a second Cup Series date, Darlington Raceway lost its fall Southern 500 date to California Speedway. That same month, Gurtis was replaced by Rockingham Speedway president Chris Browning as Darlington Raceway's president. To retain a race resembling the Southern 500, the spring race was turned into a 500 mi (800 km) event alongside the rescheduling of the event for Mother's Day weekend.

=== Post-Ferko lawsuit, return of traditional Southern 500, capacity decline ===
In 2006, the old Brasington Grandstand in turn two was demolished and replaced with a new 6,300-seat grandstand that remained under Brasington's name, in the process adding approximately 3,000 seats at a recorded capacity of 62,000. The following year, ISC approved a $10 million renovation project aimed at repaving the track, the addition of an infield tunnel, and other upgrades. The complete repaving of the track and the addition of the tunnel were completed in time for the 2008 Dodge Challenger 500. In April 2013, Wile stated potential plans to widen seats, in the process reducing capacity under 60,000; by 2018, the track's listed capacity was stated to be 58,000. Four months later, Browning resigned as president of the track, with Motor Racing Network director of business development Chip Wile assigned as Browning's replacement. In 2015, the track added approximately 4,600 ft (1,400 m) of SAFER barriers in response to Kyle Busch's injury at Daytona International Speedway.

The Southern 500 returned to its traditional Labor Day weekend date in 2015. Wile was transferred to become the president of Daytona International Speedway in June 2016, with NASCAR senior director of operations Kerry Tharp replacing Wile. In February 2018, a $7 million renovation project aimed at renovating the track's Tyler, Wallace, and Colvin grandstands; the project was completed by August 2018, in the process reducing capacity to 47,000. In 2019, ownership of the track was changed to NASCAR after the sanctioning body bought out ISC. In June 2023, Tharp announced his retirement at the end of the 2023 NASCAR season, with the track's vice president of business operations Josh Harris succeeding Tharp.

== Events ==
=== NASCAR ===
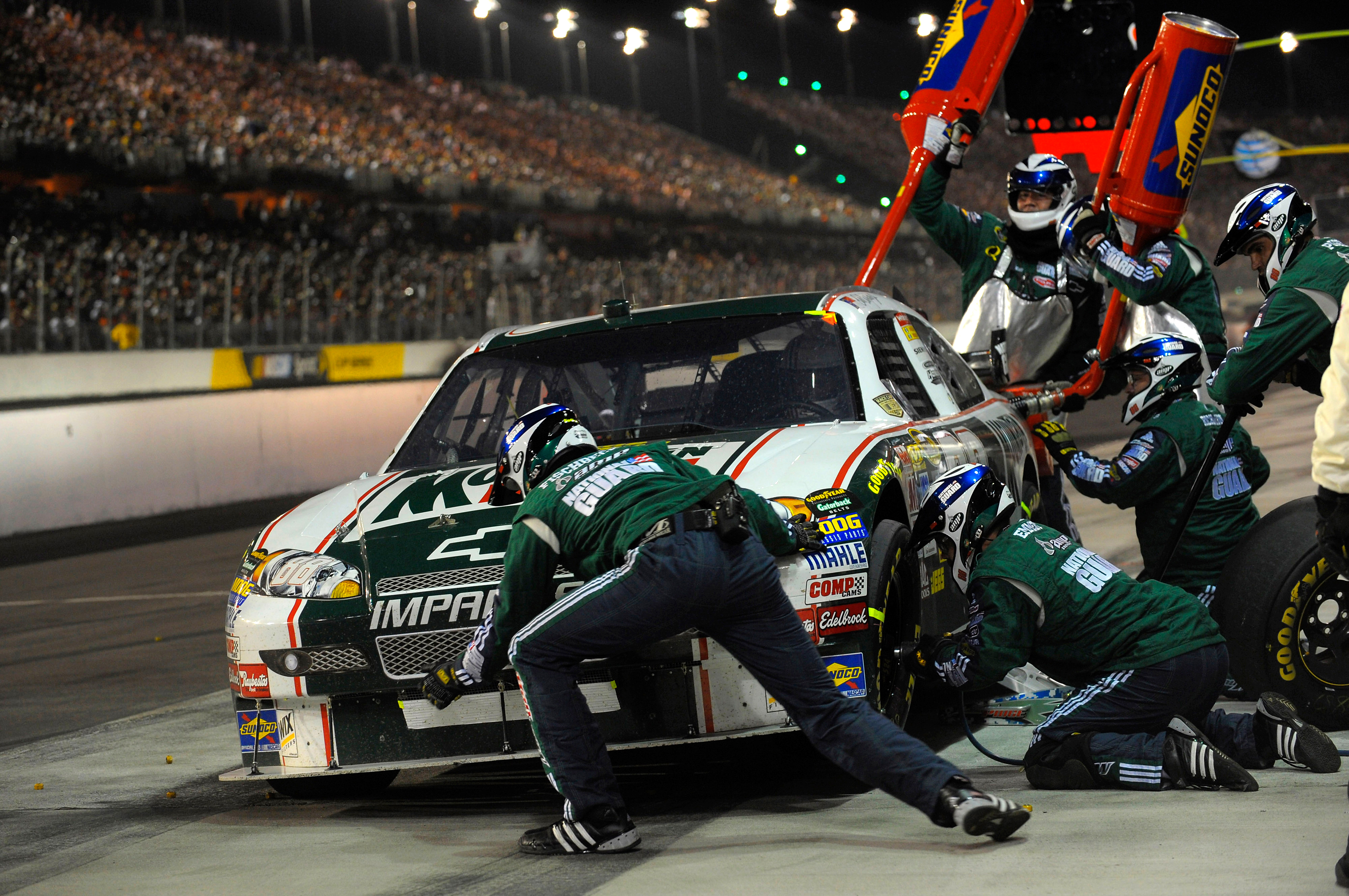
A NASCAR Cup Series pit stop at Darlington Raceway in 2008. Since 1950, the series has raced at the venue annually.

Darlington Raceway hosts two annual NASCAR weekends: the Southern 500 weekend and the Goodyear 400 weekend. The Southern 500, introduced in 1950, is considered a "Crown Jewel" race on the NASCAR schedule and was traditionally held as a standalone event on Labor Day. In 1957, a second Cup Series race, the Goodyear 400, was added, and the track hosted two events annually until 2004. In 2005, the Southern 500 replaced the Goodyear 400 on the schedule due to the result of the Ferko lawsuit. The Southern 500 was moved twice—first to April in 2014, before returning to its traditional Labor Day weekend slot in 2015. The Goodyear 400 was reinstated on the Cup Series schedule in 2021.

Starting in 1982, the NASCAR O'Reilly Auto Parts Series race was introduced to Darlington Raceway with the Sport Clips Haircuts VFW 200, and in 1983 a second date was added with the Darlington 200. In 2005, the second date was removed due to the Ferko lawsuit, but then re-added in 2021 and removed again in 2025, but then re-added in 2026. In 2001, a NASCAR Truck Series race was introduced the Buckle Up South Carolina 200.

=== Other racing events ===
- In 1950, 1951, and 1954, Darlington Raceway held races for the AAA Championship Car Series. After the series became sanctioned by USAC, Darlington held one final race in 1956.
- From 1993 to 1995, Darlington Raceway hosted an annual International Race of Champions (IROC) event.
- In 2007, Darlington Raceway held a one-off USAC Silver Crown Series event.

== Lap records ==
As of May 2021, the fastest official race lap records at Darlington Raceway are listed as:

Category	Time	Driver	Vehicle	Event
Oval (1953–present): 1.366 mi (2.198 km)
NASCAR Cup	0:28.332	Denny Hamlin	Toyota Camry	2018 Bojangles' Southern 500
NASCAR Xfinity	0:29.196	Ryan Blaney	Ford Mustang	2019 Sport Clips Haircuts VFW 200
NASCAR Truck	0:29.392	John Hunter Nemechek	Toyota Tundra	2021 LiftKits4Less.com 200
