= NASCAR Truck Series at Phoenix Raceway =

NASCAR Truck Series races at Phoenix Raceway

NASCAR Truck Series
- Venue: Phoenix Raceway
- Location: Avondale, Arizona, United States

Circuit information
- Surface: Asphalt
- Length: 1 mi (1.6 km)
- Turns: 4

Pickup truck racing events in the NASCAR Truck Series have been held at Phoenix Raceway, in Avondale, Arizona during numerous seasons and times of year since 1996. The current race, known as the Zero Carbon Bioethanol 150 Powered by POET, is 150 laps and 150 miles (241.402 km).

In 1995, the first ever NASCAR Truck Series event was held at Phoenix. Two races were held each year at Phoenix for the series from 1995–1998. Since then, the track has one Truck Series race each year and which has been held the fall each year.

From 2020 until 2025, it was part of the NASCAR Championship Weekend replacing Homestead–Miami Speedway. In 2026, Homestead–Miami would return to its traditional date as the finale for all three national series and the events at Phoenix were held in October.

== Current race ==
Zero Carbon Bioethanol 150 Powered by POET
- Corporate sponsor: POET's Zero Carbon Bioethanol
- First race: 1995
- Distance: 150 miles (241.402 km)
- Laps: 150; Stages 1/2: 45 each Final stage: 60
- Previous names: Skoal Bandit Copper World Classic (1995); Chevy Desert Star Classic (1996–1997); Chevy Trucks NASCAR 150 (1998–2000); Chevy Silverado 150 (2001–2003, 2005); Chevy Silverado 150 Presented by Valley Chevy Dealers (2004); Casino Arizona 150 (2006–2007); Lucas Oil 150 (2008–2022); Craftsman 150 (2023–2024); NASCAR Craftsman Truck Series Championship Race (2025)
- Most wins (driver): Kevin Harvick (4)
- Most wins (team): Kyle Busch Motorsports (6)
- Most wins (manufacturer): Chevrolet (18)

The Zero Carbon Bioethanol 150 Powered by POET is a NASCAR Truck Series race at Phoenix Raceway in Avondale, Arizona.

Kaden Honeycutt is the defending race winner, having won it in 2026.

=== History ===
In 1995, NASCAR created a new spec-series, called the NASCAR SuperTruck Series. The first-ever race for the series in its history was held at Phoenix on February 5, 1995, titled the Skoal Bandit Copper World Classic. From 1995–1998, the track had two events, one in the spring and one in the fall. It has been held in the fall except for 1999 and 2000 when it was held in March and 2011 when it was held in February.

From 2020 until 2025, it was part of the NASCAR Championship Weekend replacing Homestead–Miami Speedway. In 2023, when Craftsman returned to become the title sponsor of the Truck Series, they took over the title sponsorship of the race, replacing Lucas Oil.

The 2023 race was controversial. Fans had noted that drivers had no respect on the track, which contributed to the amount of wrecks and overtime restarts in the final laps. The race would end up finishing around 11 PM MST, one of the latest that a NASCAR race has finished. With a race time of 2 hours, 27 minutes, and 32 seconds, it is also one of the longest Truck Series races in history.

In 2026, Homestead–Miami Speedway would return to its traditional date as the finale for all three national series and the events at Phoenix were held in October. On October 12, 2026, it was announced that the race would be titled the Zero Carbon Bioethanol 150 Powered by POET.

=== Past winners ===
Year	Date	No.	Driver	Team	Manufacturer	Race Distance		Race Time	Average Speed (mph)	Report	Ref
Year	Date	No.	Driver	Team	Manufacturer	Laps	Miles (km)	Race Time	Average Speed (mph)	Report	Ref
1995	February 5	3	Mike Skinner	Richard Childress Racing	Chevrolet	80	80 (128.747)	0:54:49	87.565	Report	
1996	April 21	24	Jack Sprague	Hendrick Motorsports	Chevrolet	186	186 (299.337)	2:11:38	84.78	Report	
1997	April 20	24	Jack Sprague	Hendrick Motorsports	Chevrolet	150	150 (241.401)	1:27:20	103.053	Report	
1998	April 19	16	Ron Hornaday Jr.	Dale Earnhardt, Inc.	Chevrolet	150	150 (241.401)	1:28:29	101.714	Report	
1999	March 27	16	Ron Hornaday Jr.	Dale Earnhardt, Inc.	Chevrolet	150	150 (241.401)	1:34:36	95.137	Report	
2000	March 18	18	Joe Ruttman	Bobby Hamilton Racing	Dodge	150	150 (241.401)	1:30:11	99.797	Report	
2001	October 26	99	Greg Biffle	Roush Racing	Ford	159*	159 (255.885)	1:42:53	92.726	Report	
2002	November 8	6	Kevin Harvick	Kevin Harvick Inc.	Chevrolet	152*	152 (244.620)	1:24:26	108.014	Report	
2003	October 31	6	Kevin Harvick	Kevin Harvick Inc.	Chevrolet	150	150 (241.401)	1:23:42	107.527	Report	
2004	November 5	75	David Starr	Spears Motorsports	Chevrolet	150	150 (241.401)	1:39:10	90.756	Report	
2005	November 11	30	Todd Bodine	Germain Racing	Toyota	150	150 (241.401)	1:33:15	96.515	Report	
2006	November 10	23	Johnny Benson Jr.	Bill Davis Racing	Toyota	150	150 (241.401)	1:44:23	86.221	Report	
2007	November 9	51	Kyle Busch	Billy Ballew Motorsports	Chevrolet	150	150 (241.401)	1:48:09	83.218	Report	
2008	November 7	2	Kevin Harvick	Kevin Harvick Inc.	Chevrolet	150	150 (241.401)	1:42:04	88.178	Report	
2009	November 13	4	Kevin Harvick	Kevin Harvick Inc.	Chevrolet	151*	151 (243.01)	1:30:50	99.743	Report	
2010	November 12	2	Clint Bowyer	Kevin Harvick Inc.	Chevrolet	150	150 (241.401)	1:30:25	99.539	Report	
2011	February 25	18	Kyle Busch	Kyle Busch Motorsports	Toyota	150	150 (241.401)	1:40:45	89.33	Report	
2012	November 9	18	Brian Scott	Kyle Busch Motorsports	Toyota	153*	153 (246.23)	1:44:49	87.581	Report	
2013	November 8	51	Erik Jones	Kyle Busch Motorsports	Toyota	150	150 (241.401)	1:41:25	88.743	Report	
2014	November 7	51	Erik Jones	Kyle Busch Motorsports	Toyota	126*	126 (202.777)	1:39:00	76.364	Report	
2015	November 13	17	Timothy Peters	Red Horse Racing	Toyota	150	150 (241.401)	1:37:05	92.704	Report	
2016	November 11	51	Daniel Suárez	Kyle Busch Motorsports	Toyota	150	150 (241.401)	1:46:35	84.441	Report	
2017	November 10	21	Johnny Sauter	GMS Racing	Chevrolet	150	150 (241.401)	1:41:04	89.05	Report	
2018	November 9	16	Brett Moffitt	Hattori Racing Enterprises	Toyota	150	150 (241.401)	1:34:44	95.004	Report	
2019	November 8	52	Stewart Friesen	Halmar Friesen Racing	Chevrolet	150	150 (241.401)	1:32:27	97.35	Report	
2020	November 6	2	Sheldon Creed	GMS Racing	Chevrolet	156*	156 (251.057)	1:34:01	99.557	Report	
2021	November 5	18	Chandler Smith	Kyle Busch Motorsports	Toyota	150	150 (241.401)	1:30:34	99.374	Report	
2022	November 4	38	Zane Smith	Front Row Motorsports	Ford	154*	154 (247.838)	1:43:49	89.003	Report	
2023	November 3	19	Christian Eckes	McAnally–Hilgemann Racing	Chevrolet	179*	179 (288.071)	2:27:32	72.797	Report	
2024	November 8	98	Ty Majeski	ThorSport Racing	Ford	150	150 (241.401)	1:44:19	86.276	Report	
2025	October 31	11	Corey Heim	Tricon Garage	Toyota	161*	161 (259.103)	1:50:29	87.434	Report	
2026	October 16	11	Kaden Honeycutt	Tricon Garage	Toyota	150	150 (241.401)	1:24:27	106.572	Report	
2027	October 22									Report	

- 2020–2025: Races were held as the NASCAR Craftsman Truck Series Championship Race.
- 2001, 2002, 2009, 2012, 2020, 2022, 2023 and 2025: Race extended due to NASCAR overtime.
- 2014: Race shortened due to power outage.

==== Multiple winners (drivers) ====
# Wins	Driver	Years won
4	Kevin Harvick	2002, 2003, 2008, 2009
2	Jack Sprague	1996, 1997
2	Ron Hornaday Jr.	1998, 1999
2	Kyle Busch	2007, 2011
2	Erik Jones	2013, 2014

==== Multiple winners (teams) ====
# Wins	Team	Years won
6	Kyle Busch Motorsports	2011–2014, 2016, 2021
5	Kevin Harvick Inc.	2002, 2003, 2008–2010
2	Hendrick Motorsports	1996, 1997
2	Dale Earnhardt, Inc.	1998, 1999
2	GMS Racing	2017, 2020
2	Tricon Garage	2025–2026

==== Manufacturer wins ====
# Wins	Make	Years won
18	(United States) Chevrolet	1995–1999, 2002–2004, 2007–2010, 2017, 2019–2020, 2023
14	(Japan) Toyota	2005–2006, 2011–2016, 2018, 2021, 2025–2026
3	(United States) Ford	2001, 2022, 2024
1	(United States) Dodge	2000

== Former race ==
GM Goodwrench Service Plus / AC Delco 300
- Corporate sponsor: GM Goodwrench Service Plus; AC Delco
- First race: 1995
- Last race: 1998
- Distance: 186 miles (299.338 km)
- Laps: 186
- Previous names: GM Goodwrench / Delco Battery 200 (1995); GM Goodwrench / AC Delco 300 (1996); GM Goodwrench / Delco 300 (1997); GM Goodwrench Service Plus / AC Delco 300 (1998)
- Most wins (driver): Mike Skinner; Jack Sprague; Joe Ruttman; Mike Bliss (1)
- Most wins (team): Richard Childress Racing; Hendrick Motorsports; Roush Racing; Ultra Motorsports (1)
- Most wins (manufacturer): Chevrolet; Ford (2)

The GM Goodwrench Service Plus / AC Delco 300 was a NASCAR Truck Series race at Phoenix Raceway in Avondale, Arizona.

Mike Bliss was the final race winner, having won it in 1998.

=== Past winners ===
Year	Date	No.	Driver	Team	Manufacturer	Race Distance		Race Time	Average Speed (mph)	Report	Ref
Year	Date	No.	Driver	Team	Manufacturer	Laps	Miles (km)	Race Time	Average Speed (mph)	Report	Ref
1995	October 28	3	Mike Skinner	Richard Childress Racing	Chevrolet	124	124 (199.558)	1:21:40	91.102	Report	
1996	October 26	24	Jack Sprague	Hendrick Motorsports	Chevrolet	186	186 (299.337)	1:57:07	95.289	Report	
1997	November 1	80	Joe Ruttman	Roush Racing	Ford	186	186 (299.337)	1:47:22	103.942	Report	
1998	October 24	2	Mike Bliss	Ultra Motorsports	Ford	186	186 (299.337)	1:48:13	103.669	Report	

==== Multiple winners (drivers) ====
# Wins	Driver	Years won
1	Mike Skinner	1995
1	Jack Sprague	1996
1	Joe Ruttman	1997
1	Mike Bliss	1998

==== Multiple winners (teams) ====
# Wins	Team	Years won
1	Richard Childress Racing	1995
1	Hendrick Motorsports	1996
1	Roush Racing	1997
1	Ultra Motorsports	1998

==== Manufacturer wins ====
# Wins	Make	Years won
2	(United States) Chevrolet	1995, 1996
2	(United States) Ford	1997, 1998

Previous race: Ecosave 200	NASCAR Truck Series; Zero Carbon Bioethanol 150 Powered by POET	Next race: Love's RV Stop 225
