= 2013 Fred's 250 =

Race details
- Map of the Speedway
- Date: October 19, 2013
- Official name: 2013 Fred's 250
- Location: Talladega Superspeedway in Lincoln, Alabama
- Course: Permanent Racing Facility
- Course length: 2.66 miles (4.28 km)
- Distance: 94 laps, 250 mi (402 km)
- Weather: Sunny
- Average speed: 122.819 mph (197.658 km/h)

Pole position
Driver	Jeb Burton	Turner Scott Motorsports
- Time: 54.353

Most laps led
Driver	Ty Dillon	Richard Childress Racing
- Laps: 26

Winner
No. 98	Johnny Sauter	ThorSport Racing

Television in the United States
- Network: Fox Sports 1
- Announcers: Rick Allen, Phil Parsons, Michael Waltrip

The 2013 Fred's 250 Powered by Coca-Cola was a NASCAR Camping World Truck Series race that was held at Talladega Superspeedway in Lincoln, Alabama. It was the 18th race of the 2013 NASCAR Camping World Truck Series season. Truck Series rookie Jeb Burton won the pole position but it was Johnny Sauter who won the race after a last lap crash.

== Background ==
Talladega Superspeedway, the race track where the race was held.

The track, Talladega Superspeedway, is one of six superspeedways to hold NASCAR races, the others being Daytona International Speedway, Auto Club Speedway, Indianapolis Motor Speedway, Pocono Raceway and Michigan International Speedway. Talladega is a four-turn superspeedway that is 2.66 miles (4.28 km) long. The track's turns are banked at thirty-three degrees, while the front stretch, the location of the finish line, is banked at 16.5 degrees. The back stretch has a two-degree banking. Talladega Superspeedway can seat up to 143,231 people.

== Entry list ==
- (R) denotes rookie driver
- (i) denotes driver who is ineligible for series driver points

#	Driver	Team	Make
1	Timmy Hill (i)	Rick Ware Racing	Chevrolet
3	Ty Dillon	Richard Childress Racing	Chevrolet
4	Jeb Burton (R)	Turner Scott Motorsports	Chevrolet
6	Justin Lofton	Sharp Gallagher Racing	Chevrolet
07	Chris Cockrum	SS-Green Light Racing	Toyota
7	John Wes Townley	Red Horse Racing	Toyota
8	Max Gresham	Sharp Gallagher Racing	Chevrolet
9	Ron Hornaday Jr.	NTS Motorsports	Chevrolet
10	Jennifer Jo Cobb	Jennifer Jo Cobb Racing	Ram
17	Timothy Peters	Red Horse Racing	Toyota
18	Joey Coulter	Kyle Busch Motorsports	Toyota
19	Ross Chastain	Brad Keselowski Racing	Ford
20	Parker Kligerman (i)	BRG Motorsports	Toyota
24	Brennan Newberry (R)	NTS Motorsports	Chevrolet
27	Jeff Agnew	Hillman Racing	Chevrolet
29	Ryan Blaney (R)	Brad Keselowski Racing	Ford
31	James Buescher	Turner Scott Motorsports	Chevrolet
32	Miguel Paludo	Turner Scott Motorsports	Chevrolet
35	Mason Mingus	Win-Tron Racing	Chevrolet
39	Ryan Sieg	RSS Racing	Chevrolet
50	Danny Efland (i)	MAKE Motorsports	Chevrolet
51	Kyle Busch (i)	Kyle Busch Motorsports	Toyota
54	Bubba Wallace (R)	Kyle Busch Motorsports	Toyota
57	Norm Benning	Norm Benning Racing	Chevrolet
60	Dakoda Armstrong	Turn One Racing	Chevrolet
62	Brendan Gaughan	Richard Childress Racing	Chevrolet
63	Scott Stenzel	MB Motorsports	Ford
68	Clay Greenfield	Clay Greenfield Motorsports	Ram
75	Caleb Holman	Henderson Motorsports	Chevrolet
77	Germán Quiroga (R)	Red Horse Racing	Toyota
81	David Starr	SS-Green Light Racing	Toyota
82	Sean Corr	Empire Racing	Ford
83	Chris Fontaine	Glenden Enterprises	Toyota
84	Mike Harmon (i)	Mike Harmon Racing	Chevrolet
88	Matt Crafton	ThorSport Racing	Toyota
93	Chris Jones	RSS Racing	Chevrolet
98	Johnny Sauter	ThorSport Racing	Toyota
99	Bryan Silas	T3R2 Racing	Ford
Official Entry List

== Practice ==
The first and only practice session was held on Friday, October 18, at 10:30 AM EST, and would last for 2 hours. The Brad Keselowski Racing duo of Ross Chastain and Ryan Blaney set the two fastest laps of the session; Chastain was the overall fastest, with his lap clocking in at 50.191, an average speed of 190.791 mph (307.048 km/h).

Pos.	#	Driver	Team	Make	Time	Speed
1	19	Ross Chastain	Brad Keselowski Racing	Ford	50.191	190.791
2	29	Ryan Blaney	Brad Keselowski Racing	Ford	50.194	190.780
3	77	German Quiroga	Red Horse Racing	Toyota	50.485	189.680
Full practice results

== Qualifying ==
Jeb Burton won the pole with a time of 54.353 and a speed of 176.182.

Grid	No.	Driver	Team	Manufacturer	Time	Speed
1	4	Jeb Burton (R)	Turner Scott Motorsports	Chevrolet	54.353	176.182
2	8	Max Gresham	Sharp Gallagher Racing	Chevrolet	54.403	176.020
3	51	Kyle Busch (i)	Kyle Busch Motorsports	Toyota	54.437	175.910
4	31	James Buescher	Turner Scott Motorsports	Chevrolet	54.440	175.900
5	3	Ty Dillon	Richard Childress Racing	Chevrolet	54.452	175.861
6	9	Ron Hornaday Jr.	NTS Motorsports	Chevrolet	54.570	175.481
7	19	Ross Chastain	Brad Keselowski Racing	Ford	54.640	175.256
8	62	Brendan Gaughan	Richard Childress Racing	Chevrolet	54.808	174.719
9	18	Joey Coulter	Kyle Busch Motorsports	Toyota	54.808	174.719
10	54	Bubba Wallace (R)	Kyle Busch Motorsports	Toyota	54.816	174.694
11	32	Miguel Paludo	Turner Scott Motorsports	Chevrolet	54.849	174.588
12	35	Mason Mingus	Win-Tron Racing	Chevrolet	54.864	174.541
13	29	Ryan Blaney (R)	Brad Keselowski Racing	Ford	54.991	174.138
14	60	Dakoda Armstrong	Turn One Racing	Chevrolet	54.998	174.115
15	24	Brennan Newberry (R)	NTS Motorsports	Chevrolet	55.023	174.036
16	6	Justin Lofton	Sharp Gallagher Racing	Chevrolet	55.034	174.002
17	83	Chris Fontaine	Glenden Enterprises	Toyota	55.109	173.765
18	20	Parker Kligerman (i)	BRG Motorsports	Toyota	55.133	173.689
19	7	John Wes Townley	Red Horse Racing	Toyota	55.222	173.409
20	77	Germán Quiroga (R)	Red Horse Racing	Toyota	55.247	173.331
21	68	Clay Greenfield	Clay Greenfield Motorsports	Ram	55.266	173.271
22	82	Sean Corr	Empire Racing	Ford	55.449	172.699
23	88	Matt Crafton**	ThorSport Racing	Toyota	55.519	172.481
24	98	Johnny Sauter	ThorSport Racing	Toyota	55.583	172.283
25	81	David Starr	SS-Green Light Racing	Toyota	55.633	172.128
26	99	Bryan Silas	T3R2 Racing	Ford	55.696	171.933
27	1	Timmy Hill (i)	Rick Ware Racing	Chevrolet	55.810	171.582
28	75	Caleb Holman	Henderson Motorsports	Chevrolet	56.030	170.908
29	39	Ryan Sieg	RSS Racing	Chevrolet	56.036	170.890
30	93	Chris Jones	RSS Racing	Chevrolet	56.159	170.516
31	17	Timothy Peters**	Red Horse Racing	Toyota	56.174	170.470
32	27	Jeff Agnew	Hillman Racing	Chevrolet	56.197	170.401
33	57	Norm Benning	Norm Benning Racing	Chevrolet	56.209	170.364
34	07	Chris Cockrum* **	SS-Green Light Racing	Toyota	56.462	169.601
35	84	Mike Harmon(i)*	Mike Harmon Racing	Chevrolet	59.168	161.844
36	63	Scott Stenzel	MB Motorsports	Ford	56.228	170.307
Failed to Qualify
37	50	Danny Efland	MAKE Motorsports	Chevrolet	56.314	170.047
38	10	Jennifer Jo Cobb	Jennifer Jo Cobb Racing	Ram	57.077	167.773
Official Qualifying results

* – Chris Cockrum and Mike Harmon made the field via owners points.

** – Chris Cockrum, Timothy Peters, and Matt Crafton had to go to the rear of the field for unapproved adjustments.

== Race ==
Pole sitter Jeb Burton led only the first lap of the race before losing the lead on the next lap to James Buescher. The first caution flew on lap 8 after Mason Mingus' engine blew up and laid fluid on the racetrack. The race restarted on lap 14. Chris Fontaine took the lead from James Buescher on lap 15. Buescher would take it back on lap 18 of the race. The second caution flew on lap 20 when Chris Cockrum's left front tire blew and laid debris on the front stretch. Kyle Busch won the race off of pit road after going for a fuel only stop and led the field to the restart on lap 24. Ty Dillon took the lead from Busch on the restart with a push by James Buescher. On lap 31, Ross Chastain took the lead with a push from Ryan Blaney but Dillon took it back the next lap. On lap 35, Joey Coulter took the lead with a push by Parker Kligerman but Dillon took the lead back again the next lap. Parker Kligerman took the lead from Dillon on lap 38 of the race. On lap 42, Ty Dillon would take the lead back.

With 42 laps to go, Parker Kligerman took the lead back from Dillon as green flag pitstops began. During pitstops with 40 laps to go, Sean Corr was coming in to pit but got bumped from behind by Ty Dillon and spun through the infield grass bringing out the third caution of the race. Kligerman was coming in to pit when the Caution flew and Johnny Sauter took the lead. Rookie Bubba Wallace was the new race leader and lead them to the restart with 34 laps to go. With 31 to go, Ty Dillon took the lead from Wallace. With 29 laps to go, the 4th caution flew for a 6 truck wreck in turn 3. It started when Caleb Holman tried to go in front of Jeb Burton but was not clear and spun down into Timothy Peters and the two trucks went up the track and collected Chris Cockrum, Sean Corr, and rookies Brennan Newberry and Germán Quiroga. With 28 to go, Parker Kligerman took the lead. The race restarted with 21 laps to go. On the restart, rookie Ryan Blaney took the lead from Kligerman with a push by Johnny Sauter. Kligerman took it back with 20 to go. With 19 to go, Ty Dillon took the lead. Johnny Sauter took the lead from Dillon two laps later. On the next lap, Ross Chastain took the lead. With 15 laps to go, the 5th caution flew for a 5 truck crash on the backstretch. It started when Ron Hornaday made contact with James Buescher and Hornaday got squeezed in nearly four wide between Justin Lofton and Buescher and Hornaday turned Lofton and Buescher spun up and got t-boned in the right side by Joey Coulter while Jeff Agnew spun to avoid the wreck and hit the inside wall. The race restarted with 10 laps to go. Chastain took the lead and held on to it. Unfortunetly for Chastain, the 6th caution flew with 7 to go for a 3 truck crash down the backstretch involving Ron Hornaday, Ryan Blaney, and Scott Stenzel. The wreck would set up and three lap shootout.

=== Final Laps ===
On the restart, trucks began to form into tandems. Chastain was tandemed with Parker Kligerman and took the lead. With 3 to go, the ThorSport tandem in Johnny Sauter and Matt Crafton attempted to pass Chastain and Kligerman. Behind them, another tandem in Dakoda Armstrong and Kyle Busch peeked to the outside and attempted to make it three wide for the lead. Chastain managed to snag the lead as they took the white flag. Down the backstretch, the three tandems were evenly three wide for the lead. Unfortunately for Armstrong and Busch, their tandem lost momentum in turn 4 and it was down to a side by side battle between Sauter and Chastain as the trucks began to overheat. Coming towards the tri-oval, chaos ensued. Jeb Burton got turned by Miguel Paludo and Burton spun up into Kyle Busch and the two spun down. The two collected Bubba Wallace while Kyle Busch clipped Paludo's truck and sent Paludo upside down. The wreck also collected Timmy Hill, Clay Greenfield, Justin Lofton, John Wes Townley, and Chris Fontaine. While they were wrecking, the five trucks in Sauter, Crafton, Chastain, Armstrong, and Kligerman broke away. But Chastain got hooked by Kligerman and took out Crafton and Armstrong leaving only Johnny Sauter. The 7th and final caution flew before Sauter crossed the finish line and Sauter was declared the winner. Another truck made it out of the wreck unscathed and that was David Starr and Starr finished in second. Trucks came by the start-finish line still crashing everywhere. Kyle Busch ended up hitting the inside wall at the end of pit road very hard. Miguel Paludo was still upside down while he was getting hit by many other trucks. The truck would flip back up on all fours but short of the start-finish line. A total of 13 trucks were caught in the wreck. Everyone was ok including Kyle Busch who took a seat at the front stretch wall. This would be Sauter's 3rd and final win of 2013. Ross Chastain, Parker Kligerman, and Dakoda Armstrong rounded out the top 5 while Timmy Hill, John Wes Townley, Max Gresham, Matt Crafton, and Kyle Busch rounded out the top 10.

== Race results ==
Pos	Car	Driver	Team	Manufacturer	Laps Run	Laps Led	Status	Points
1	98	Johnny Sauter	ThorSport Racing	Toyota	94	5	running	47
2	81	David Starr	SS-Green Light Racing	Toyota	94	0	running	42
3	19	Ross Chastain	Brad Keselowski Racing	Ford	94	14	running	42
4	20	Parker Kligerman (i)	BRG Motorsports	Toyota	94	16	running	0
5	60	Dakoda Armstrong	Turn One Racing	Chevrolet	94	0	running	39
6	1	Timmy Hill (i)	Rick Ware Racing	Chevrolet	94	0	running	0
7	7	John Wes Townley	Red Horse Racing	Toyota	94	0	running	37
8	8	Max Gresham	Sharp Gallagher Racing	Chevrolet	94	0	running	36
9	88	Matt Crafton	ThorSport Racing	Toyota	94	1	running	36
10	51	Kyle Busch (i)	Kyle Busch Motorsports	Toyota	94	5	running	0
11	62	Brendan Gaughan	Richard Childress Racing	Chevrolet	94	0	running	33
12	57	Norm Benning	Norm Benning Racing	Chevrolet	94	0	running	32
13	68	Clay Greenfield	Clay Greenfield Racing	Ram	94	0	running	31
14	3	Ty Dillon	Richard Childress Racing	Chevrolet	94	26	running	32
15	83	Chris Fontaine	Glenden Enterprises	Toyota	94	3	running	30
16	99	Bryan Silas	T3R2 Racing	Ford	94	0	running	28
17	54	Bubba Wallace (R)	Kyle Busch Motorsports	Toyota	94	4	running	28
18	4	Jeb Burton (R)	Turner Scott Motorsports	Chevrolet	93	1	running	27
19	32	Miguel Paludo	Turner Scott Motorsports	Chevrolet	93	0	running	25
20	6	Justin Lofton	Sharp Gallagher Racing	Chevrolet	93	0	running	24
21	29	Ryan Blaney (R)	Brad Keselowski	Ford	92	1	running	24
22	84	Mike Harmon (i)	Mike Harmon Racing	Chevrolet	91	0	running	0
23	39	Ryan Sieg	RSS Racing	Chevrolet	87	0	crash	21
24	9	Ron Hornaday Jr.	NTS Motorsports	Chevrolet	87	0	crash	20
25	63	Scott Stenzel	MB Motorsports	Ford	87	0	crash	19
26	31	James Buescher	Turner Scott Motorsports	Chevrolet	79	16	crash	19
27	18	Joey Coulter	Kyle Busch Motorsports	Toyota	79	1	crash	18
28	27	Jeff Agnew	Hillman Racing	Chevrolet	79	0	crash	16
29	17	Timothy Peters	Red Horse Racing	Toyota	65	0	crash	15
30	75	Caleb Holman	Henderson Motorsports	Chevrolet	65	0	crash	14
31	77	Germán Quiroga (R)	Red Horse Racing	Toyota	65	0	crash	13
32	24	Brennan Newberry (R)	NTS Motorsports	Chevrolet	65	0	crash	12
33	82	Sean Corr	Empire Racing	Ford	65	0	crash	11
34	07	Chris Cockrum	SS-Green Light Racing	Toyota	65	0	crash	10
35	93	Chris Jones	RSS Racing	Chevrolet	27	1	overheating	10
36	35	Mason Mingus	Win-Tron Racing	Chevrolet	5	0	oil leak	8
Official Race results

Previous race: 2013 Smith's 350	NASCAR Camping World Truck Series; 2013 season	Next race: 2013 Kroger 200
