= NASCAR Truck Series at Darlington Raceway =

NASCAR Truck Series race at Darlington

Buckle Up South Carolina 200

NASCAR Truck Series
- Venue: Darlington Raceway
- Location: Darlington, South Carolina
- Corporate sponsor: South Carolina Department of Public Safety
- First race: 2001
- Distance: 200.802 miles (323.159 km)
- Laps: 147; Stages 1/2: 45 each Final stage: 57
- Previous names: Darlington 200 (2001, 2004); Craftsman Anniversary 200 (2002); Craftsman 200 (2003); Too Tough To Tame 200 (2010–2011); South Carolina Education Lottery 200 (2020); LiftKits4Less.com 200 (2021 I); In It To Win It 200 (2021 II); Dead On Tools 200 (2022); Buckle Up South Carolina 200 (2023–2024, 2026); Sober or Slammer 200 (2025)
- Most wins (driver): Bobby Hamilton; Kasey Kahne; Corey Heim (2)
- Most wins (team): Bobby Hamilton Racing; Ultra Motorsports; Kyle Busch Motorsports; Tricon Garage (2)
- Most wins (manufacturer): Toyota (5)

Circuit information
- Surface: Asphalt
- Length: 1.366 mi (2.198 km)
- Turns: 4

The Buckle Up South Carolina 200 is a NASCAR Truck Series race held at Darlington Raceway. The distance of the race is approximately 201 miles (323 km), contested over 147 laps.

Corey Heim is the defending winner of this race, having won it in 2026.

== History ==
First ran in 2001, it was taken off the schedule after the 2004 season. In 2009, they announced after a six-year hiatus, Darlington would return to the Truck Series in August 2010. At the end of the year, they moved the race from August to mid-March for 2011. The race had been held under the lights since 2004. On November 21, 2011, it was announced that the event would once again be removed from the schedule.

The race returned to the Truck Series schedule in 2020 on Labor Day weekend initially as a one-off replacement date for the Chevrolet Silverado 250 at Canadian Tire Motorsport Park, which was canceled due to the COVID-19 pandemic. It also became part of "throwback weekend" with the Cup and Xfinity Series, which already had races at Darlington that weekend. It became a permanent date on the 2021 schedule and was pushed to the throwback weekend, now in May. The Truck Series race would continue to race with the Cup and Xfinity Series there as part of a new second race weekend for those two series there.

The South Carolina Education Lottery sponsored the race in 2020. When it was retained on the 2021 schedule, The 4Less Group took over as title sponsor with its LiftKits4Less.com brand. The State of South Carolina took over naming rights for the temporary 2021 race and the South Carolina Education Lottery returned as the race's associate sponsor after being the title sponsor in 2020. The name of the race was the In It To Win It 200 (presented by the South Carolina Education Lottery) as the state government partnered with the track to give away prizes to those who received a COVID-19 vaccine at the track on the day of the race. The race at Canadian Tire Motorsport Park was canceled and moved to Darlington due to the COVID pandemic. Dead On Tools became the title sponsor of the track's one race in 2022.

For the races in 2023 and in 2024, the South Carolina Department of Public Safety sponsored the race called the Buckle Up South Carolina 200.

For 2025, the race would move to the Southern 500 weekend, where it was held while the Xfinity Series held a race at Portland International Raceway that weekend. Both the Truck and Cup races started their respective series' playoffs. On May 7, it was announced that the South Carolina Department of Public Safety would remain as the sponsor, this time calling it the Sober or Slammer 200.

In 2026, the race moved back to the spring as a support race of the Cup Series' Goodyear 400 and O'Reilly Series Sports Clips Haircuts VFW 200.

=== Past winners ===
Year	Date	Driver	Team	Manufacturer	Race Distance		Race Time	Average Speed (mph)	Report	Ref
Year	Date	Driver	Team	Manufacturer	Laps	Miles (km)	Race Time	Average Speed (mph)	Report	Ref
2001	May 12	Bobby Hamilton	Bobby Hamilton Racing	Dodge	135*	184.41 (296.779)	1:44:55	105.461	Report	
2002	March 15	Ted Musgrave	Ultra Motorsports	Dodge	147	200.802 (323.159)	1:50:32	109	Report	
2003	March 14	Bobby Hamilton	Bobby Hamilton Racing	Dodge	147	200.802 (323.159)	1:30:09	133.645	Report	
2004	November 13	Kasey Kahne	Ultra Motorsports	Dodge	150*	204.9 (329.754)	1:57:10	104.927	Report	
2005 – 2009	Not held									
2010	August 14	Todd Bodine	Germain Racing	Toyota	147	200.802 (323.159)	1:52:04	107.509	Report	
2011	March 12	Kasey Kahne	Kyle Busch Motorsports	Toyota	147	200.802 (323.159)	1:59:44	100.625	Report	
2012 – 2019	Not held									
2020	September 6*	Ben Rhodes	ThorSport Racing	Ford	147	200.802 (323.159)	1:53:44	109.536	Report	
2021	May 7	Sheldon Creed	GMS Racing	Chevrolet	147	200.802 (323.159)	2:28:40	81.041	Report	
2021	September 5*	Sheldon Creed	GMS Racing	Chevrolet	147	200.802 (323.159)	1:54:23	105.331	Report	
2022	May 6	John Hunter Nemechek	Kyle Busch Motorsports	Toyota	149*	203.534 (327.555)	2:13:17	91.625	Report	
2023	May 12	Christian Eckes	McAnally–Hilgemann Racing	Chevrolet	158*	213.096 (342.944)	2:02:42	105.539	Report	
2024	May 10	Ross Chastain	Niece Motorsports	Chevrolet	150*	204.9 (329.754)	2:00:33	101.983	Report	
2025	August 30	Corey Heim	Tricon Garage	Toyota	147	200.802 (323.159)	1:39:09	121.514	Report	
2026	March 20	Corey Heim	Tricon Garage	Toyota	157*	214.462 (345.142)	2:12:39	97.005	Report	
2027	April 2								Report	

- 2001: Race shortened due to rain.
- 2004, 2022–2024 & 2026: Races extended due to a green–white–checkered finish.
- 2020 & 2021 II: Replaced the races at Canadian Tire Motorsport Park due to the COVID-19 pandemic.

=== Multiple winners (drivers) ===
# Wins	Driver	Years won
2	Bobby Hamilton	2001, 2003
2	Kasey Kahne	2004, 2011
2	Sheldon Creed	2021 I, 2021 II
2	Corey Heim	2025, 2026

=== Multiple winners (teams) ===
# Wins	Team	Years won
2	Bobby Hamilton Racing	2001, 2003
2	Ultra Motorsports	2002, 2004
2	Kyle Busch Motorsports	2011, 2022
2	GMS Racing	2021 I, 2021 II
2	Tricon Garage	2025, 2026

=== Manufacturer wins ===
# Wins	Make	Years won
5	(Japan) Toyota	2010, 2011, 2022, 2025, 2026
4	(Germany) Dodge	2001-2004
4	(United States) Chevrolet	2021 I, 2021 II, 2023, 2024
1	(United States) Ford	2020

Previous race: OnlyBulls Green Flag 150	NASCAR Craftsman Truck Series; Buckle Up South Carolina 200	Next race: Tennessee Army National Guard 250
