= 2016 USAC National Midget Series =

The 2016 USAC National Midget Championship is the 61st season of the USAC National Midget Championship. The series began with the Shamrock Classic at Southern Illinois Center on March 9, and ended with the Turkey Night Grand Prix at Perris Auto Speedway on November 24. Tracy Hines entered the season as the defending champion.

The season was marred with tragedy after Bryan Clauson died from injuries sustained in a crash during Saturday's portion of the Belleville Midget Nationals. Tanner Thorson won the series championship driving for Keith Kunz/Curb-Agajanian Motorsports.

== Schedule ==
No.	Date	Race title	Track	TV/Stream
1	March 9	Shamrock Classic	Southern Illinois Center	The Cushion
≠	April 8	Kokomo Grand Prix	Kokomo Speedway	
≠	April 9	Kokomo Grand Prix	Kokomo Speedway	
2	May 31	Indiana Midget Week	Montpelier Motor Speedway	
3	June 1	Indiana Midget Week	Gas City I-69 Speedway	
4	June 2	Indiana Midget Week	Lincoln Park Speedway	
5	June 3	Indiana Midget Week	Bloomington Speedway	
≠	June 4	Indiana Midget Week	Lawrenceburg Speedway	
6	June 5	Indiana Midget Week	Kokomo Speedway	
7	June 17		Riverside International Speedway	
8	June 18	40 for Shorty	Riverside International Speedway	
9	August 2	Tuesday Night Thunder	Jefferson County Speedway	
10	August 3	Chad McDaniel Memorial	Solomon Valley Speedway	Speed Shift TV
11	August 5	Belleville Midget Nationals	Belleville High Banks	Speed Shift TV
12	August 6	Belleville Midget Nationals	Belleville High Banks	Speed Shift TV
≠	August 14	Pennsylvania Midget Week	Susquehanna Speedway	
≠	August 15	Pennsylvania Midget Week	Path Valley Speedway Park	
13	August 16	Pennsylvania Midget Week	Clyde Martin Memorial Speedway	
≠	August 17	Pennsylvania Midget Week	Lincoln Speedway	Dirt Station
14	September 24	4-Crown Nationals	Eldora Speedway	
15	October 6	Gold Crown Midget Nationals	Tri-City Speedway	The Cushion
16	October 7	Gold Crown Midget Nationals	Tri-City Speedway	The Cushion
17	October 8	Gold Crown Midget Nationals	Tri-City Speedway	The Cushion
18	October 20	Jason Leffler Memorial	Wayne County Speedway	MavTV
19	November 24	Turkey Night Grand Prix	Ventura Raceway	Loudpedal.TV
*	December 17	Junior Knepper 55	Southern Illinois Center	MavTV Speed Shift TV

== Results and standings ==
=== Races ===
No.	Race / Track	Winning driver	Winning team	Hard Charger Award winner	B-Main / Semi / Qualifying Race winners
1	Shamrock Classic	Shane Golobic	Matt Wood Racing		Thomas Meseruall (B-Main #1) Travis Berryhill (B-Main #2)
2	Indiana Midget Week (Montpelier)	Kyle Larson	Keith Kunz/Curb-Agajanian Motorsports	Dave Darland	Christopher Bell
3	Indiana Midget Week (Gas City)	Spencer Bayston	Keith Kunz/Curb-Agajanian Motorsports	Shane Golobic	Tyler Thomas
4	Indiana Midget Week (Putnamville)	Tanner Thorson	Keith Kunz/Curb-Agajanian Motorsports	Jerry Coons Jr.	Spencer Bayston
5	Indiana Midget Week (Bloomington)	Christopher Bell	Keith Kunz/Curb-Agajanian Motorsports	Tyler Thomas	Christopher Bell
6	Indiana Midget Week (Kokomo)	Rico Abreu	Keith Kunz/Curb-Agajanian Motorsports	Dayne Kingshott	Holly Shelton
7	Riverside	Tanner Thorson	Keith Kunz/Curb-Agajanian Motorsports	Shane Golobic	
8	40 For Shorty	Bryan Clauson	Dooling/Hayward Motorsports	Bryan Clauson	
9	Tuesday Night Thunder	Chad Boat	Tucker/Boat Motorsports	Bryan Clauson	Brady Bacon
10	Chad McDaniel Memorial	Bryan Clauson	Dooling/Hayward Motorsports	Tanner Thorson	Casey Shuman
11	Belleville Midget Nationals (night #1)	Chad Boat	Tucker/Boat Motorsports	Travis Scott	Bryan Clauson
12	Belleville Midget Nationals (night #2)	Chad Boat	Tucker/Boat Motorsports	Curtis Spicer	Ryan Greth
13	Pennsylvania Midget Week (Lanco)	Tanner Thorson	Keith Kunz/Curb-Agajanian Motorsports	Brenden Bright	Holly Shelton
14	Four Crown Nationals	Rico Abreu	Keith Kunz/Curb-Agajanian Motorsports	Carson Macedo	
15	Gold Crown Midget Nationals (night #1)	Tanner Thorson	Keith Kunz/Curb-Agajanian Motorsports	Gage Walker	Chad Boat (Qualifying Race #1) Carson Macedo (Qualifying Race #2) Tanner Thorson (Qualifying Race #3)
16	Gold Crown Midget Nationals (night #2)	Tanner Thorson	Keith Kunz/Curb-Agajanian Motorsports	Alex Bright	Brady Bacon (Qualifying Race #1) Tyler Thomas (Qualifying Race #2) Kyle Jones (Qualifying Race #3)
17	Gold Crown Midget Nationals (night #3)	Tanner Thorson	Keith Kunz/Curb-Agajanian Motorsports	Jake Neuman	Tanner Thorson (Qualifying Race #1) Ryan Robinson (Qualifying Race #2) Holly Shelton (Qualifying Race #3)
18	Jason Leffler Memorial	Brady Bacon	FMR Racing	Alex Bright	Justin Peck
19	Turkey Night Grand Prix	Kyle Larson	Keith Kunz/Curb-Agajanian Motorsports	Jake Swanson	Robby Josett
*	Junior Knepper 55	Tyler Courtney	Clauson/Marshall Racing		Chad Wheeler (B-Main #1) Riley Kreisel (B-Main #2)
