= Ricky Stenhouse Jr. =

American racing driver (born 1987)

- Stenhouse at Las Vegas Motor Speedway in 2026
- Born: Richard Lynn Stenhouse Jr. October 2, 1987 (age 39); Memphis, Tennessee, U.S.
- Height: 5 ft 10 in (1.78 m)
- Achievements: 2023 Daytona 500 Winner; 2011, 2012 NASCAR Nationwide Series Champion; 2020 Daytona 500 Pole Winner; 2007 Knoxville Midget Nationals Winner; 2015 Junior Knepper 55 Winner (inaugural race); 2007 4-Crown Nationals Midget Winner
- Awards: 2010 NASCAR Nationwide Series Rookie of the Year; 2013 NASCAR Sprint Cup Series Rookie of the Year

NASCAR Cup Series career
- 508 races run over 16 years
- Car no., team: No. 47 (Hyak Motorsports)
- 2026 position: 28th
- Best finish: 13th (2017)
- First race: 2011 Coca-Cola 600 (Charlotte)
- Last race: 2026 Season Finale 400 (Homestead)
- First win: 2017 GEICO 500 (Talladega)
- Last win: 2024 YellaWood 500 (Talladega)
Wins	Top tens	Poles
4	68	3

NASCAR O'Reilly Auto Parts Series career
- 110 races run over 7 years
- 2022 position: 104th
- Best finish: 1st (2011, 2012)
- First race: 2009 Nashville 300 (Nashville)
- Last race: 2022 Wawa 250 (Daytona)
- First win: 2011 John Deere Dealers 250 (Iowa)
- Last win: 2012 Kansas Lottery 300 (Kansas)
Wins	Top tens	Poles
8	63	8

NASCAR FedEx Freight Truck Series career
- 5 races run over 1 year
- 2026 position: 105th
- Best finish: 105th (2026)
- First race: 2026 Fresh From Florida 250 (Daytona)
- Last race: 2026 DQS Solutions & Staffing 250 (Michigan)
Wins	Top tens	Poles
0	4	0

ARCA Menards Series career
- 21 races run over 1 year
- Best finish: 4th (2008)
- First race: 2008 ARCA 200 at Daytona (Daytona)
- Last race: 2008 Hantz Group 200 (Toledo)
- First win: 2008 Drive Smart! Buckle-Up Kentucky 150 (Kentucky)
- Last win: 2008 Pocono 200 (Pocono)
Wins	Top tens	Poles
2	14	3

ARCA Menards Series West career
- 1 race run over 1 year
- Best finish: 52nd (2014)
- First race: 2014 Carneros 200 (Sonoma)
Wins	Top tens	Poles
0	1	0
- Statistics up to date as of November 8, 2026.

Richard Lynn Stenhouse Jr. (born October 2, 1987) is an American professional stock car racing driver. He competes full-time in the NASCAR Cup Series, driving the No. 47 Chevrolet Camaro ZL1 for Hyak Motorsports. Stenhouse was the 2010 NASCAR Nationwide Series Rookie of the Year, and won back-to-back Nationwide Series championships in 2011 and 2012. Stenhouse was the 2013 NASCAR Sprint Cup Series Rookie of the Year. He is the 2023 Daytona 500 winner.

== Racing career ==
=== Early career ===
Stenhouse began kart racing at the age of six, and acquired 47 wins and ninety podium finishes by the time he moved into sprint car racing in 2003.

Beginning his sprint car racing career in 360 cubic inches winged sprint cars, Stenhouse won the National Sprint Car Hall of Fame Driver Poll and Dirt Winged Sprint Car Rookie of the Year in 2003. He began racing in the USAC sprint car series in 2004, and in 2006 won National Sprint Car Hall of Fame Driver Poll Wild Card in both the 360 and 410 winged sprint car divisions. Stenhouse won dual Rookie of the Year honors in the United States Auto Club sprint car (finished 6th in the standings) and midget (finished 3rd in the standings) series in 2007.

In 2008, Stenhouse began his major-league stock car racing career in the ARCA Racing Series, driving for Roush Fenway Racing. On May 10, 2008, in only his sixth race in a stock car, he won his first ARCA RE/MAX Series event at the Drive Smart! Buckle Up Kentucky 150 at Kentucky Speedway in Sparta, Kentucky. He had two wins in 21 races and finished fourth in the season ranking as a rookie.

=== NASCAR ===
==== 2009–2012 ====
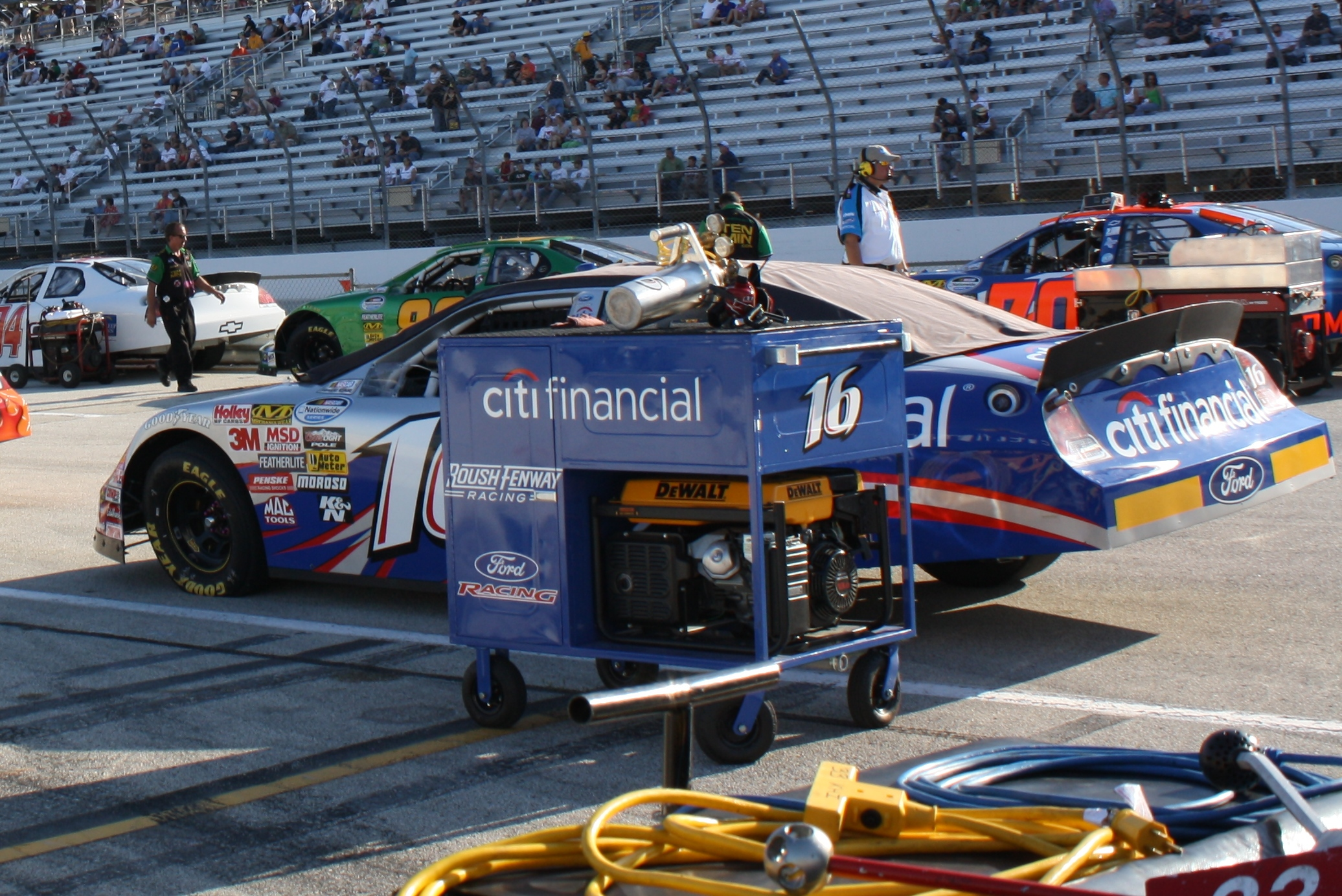
Stenhouse's 2009 Nationwide Series car at the Milwaukee Mile

In 2009, Stenhouse began competing in a partial schedule in the Nationwide Series at events that conflicted with the Sprint Cup schedule. He had his first top-ten finish at Kentucky Speedway when he finished ninth. At the following race in Milwaukee, he led 46 laps in the later stages of the race and finished fifth.

The 2010 season started horribly for Stenhouse, but he showed signs of life as the year went on. After crashing out of four out of the first ten races of the season (and crashing in practice also), Stenhouse was replaced by Brian Ickler for three races, and Billy Johnson drove at Watkins Glen. After taking on veteran Mike Kelley as crew chief, Stenhouse immediately responded with a third-place finish at Daytona. He proceeded to take seven top tens and was locked in a tight battle for Rookie of the Year (ROTY) with Brian Scott. With Scott struggling after his release from Turner Motorsports, Stenhouse took the ROTY award after a fourth-place finish at Homestead.

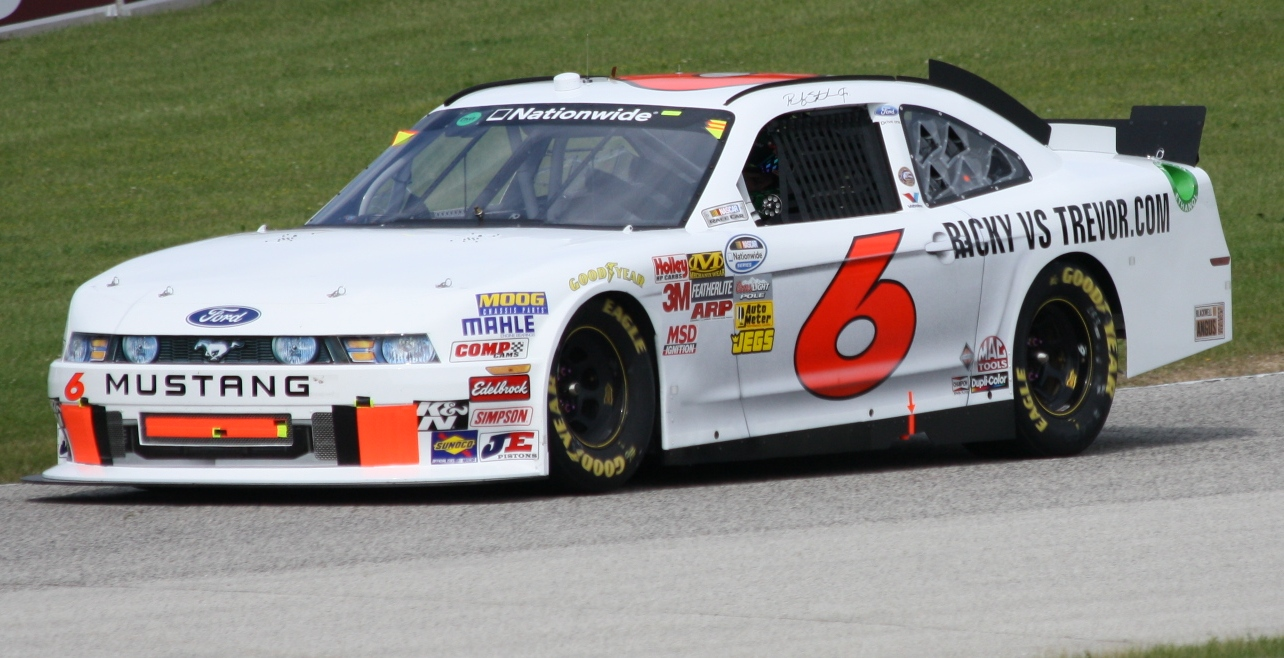
2011 Nationwide championship car at Road America

On May 22, 2011, Stenhouse held off charges from Carl Edwards and Brad Keselowski for the final eighteen laps to claim his first win in the John Deere Dealers 250 at Iowa Speedway, his 51st start in the Nationwide Series.

Stenhouse made his Sprint Cup Series debut at the 2011 Coca-Cola 600, substituting for fellow Roush teammate Trevor Bayne. Stenhouse finished eleventh in the Wood Brothers Racing entry.

Stenhouse had dominated the Kroger 200 Nationwide Series race at Lucas Oil Raceway before being passed by Brad Keselowski late in the race. Stenhouse took his second Nationwide win at Iowa in August, again holding off teammate Carl Edwards, but more bizarrely, as Stenhouse's engine blew coming off of turn 4. Edwards subsequently rear-ended his teammate, pushing him across the line to the win.

At the end of the 2011 season, having scored sixteen top-five finishes, Stenhouse won the Nationwide Series championship by 45 points over Elliott Sadler.

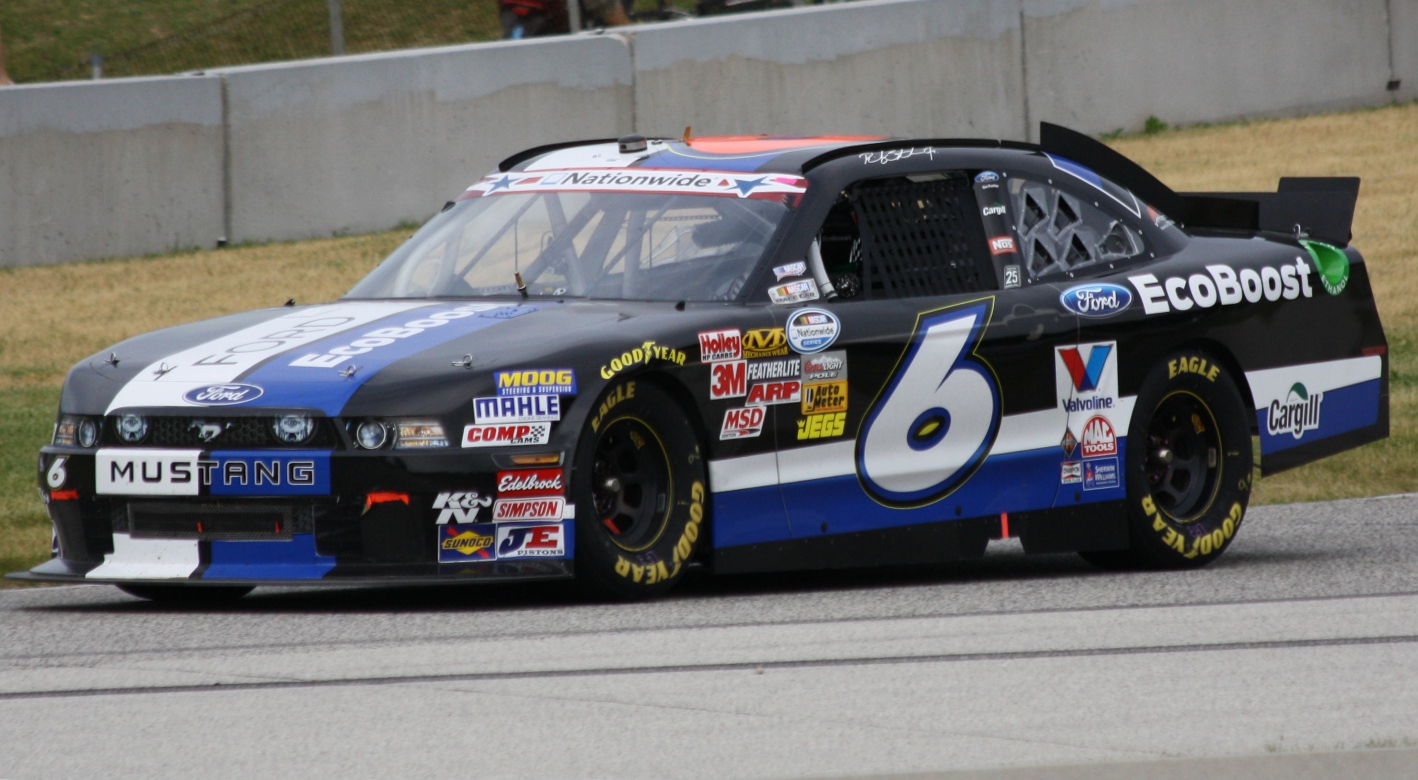
2012 Nationwide car

Stenhouse drove the No. 6 Sprint Cup Series car for Roush Fenway Racing in the 2012 Daytona 500, finishing 20th.

In the Nationwide Series the previous day, Stenhouse had been caught up in a ten-car wreck on the final lap of the series' season-opening event; a week later he finished third at Phoenix, while a week after that Stenhouse won his first race of 2012 at Las Vegas, winning the Sam's Town 300, holding off Mark Martin to take the checkered flag; he would win races at Texas Motor Speedway and Iowa Speedway before suffering a run of bad luck starting at Charlotte Motor Speedway. Stenhouse would score three more victories at Atlanta, Charlotte, and Kansas. He once again held off Sadler to take his second consecutive Nationwide Series championship.

==== 2013–2019: Roush Fenway Racing ====
On June 26, 2012, Roush Fenway Racing announced that Stenhouse would drive the No. 17 car in the Sprint Cup Series full-time for 2013, replacing Matt Kenseth. Trevor Bayne replaced Stenhouse in the Nationwide No. 6 car for 2013.

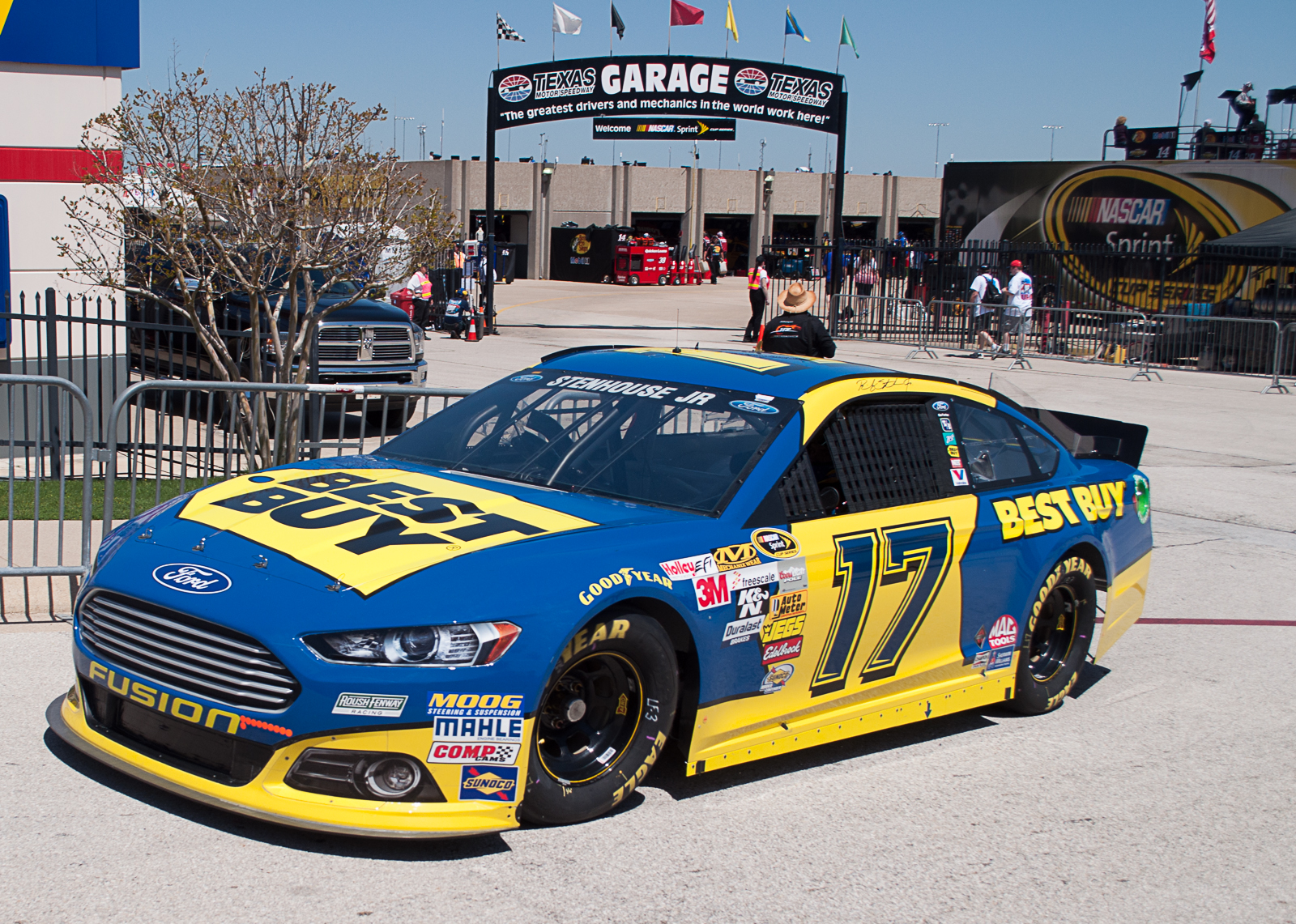
Stenhouse during practice for the 2013 NRA 500 at Texas Motor Speedway

To prepare for the 2013 season, Stenhouse ran in the AAA 400 at Dover International Speedway, where he finished twelfth, the Bank of America 500 at Charlotte Motor Speedway, where he finished 35th because of engine problems, but he was running near the front of the field. He also ran in the season finale Ford 400 at Homestead-Miami Speedway, in which bad luck struck again as he cut a tire and smacked the wall, similar to what happened to Marcos Ambrose two races before, in Texas. In all of these races, he ran in the No. 6 car of Roush Fenway Racing sponsored by Cargill, Best Buy, and Fifth Third Bank, respectively.

In 2013, Stenhouse competed full-time in the No. 17 Ford Fusion in the Sprint Cup Series. He was paired with rookie crew chief Scott Graves, who was formerly an engineer for Roush Fenway Racing. Stenhouse placed twelfth in his second Daytona 500 (his first with the No. 17 team) despite suffering crash damage on lap 134. Stenhouse led his first lap of Sprint Cup competition at Las Vegas Motor Speedway. Later in the season, Stenhouse had his breakout race at Kansas, where he qualified third and led 26 laps before finishing eleventh. In qualifying at Atlanta Motor Speedway, Stenhouse won the pole position with a 29.227 lap time. Stenhouse recorded his first top-ten finish with a tenth-place finish at Richmond, followed by an eighth-place finish at Chicagoland. His best finish of the season was a third-place finish at Talladega behind Jamie McMurray and Dale Earnhardt Jr.. Stenhouse was eventually named Cup Series Rookie of the Year.

In 2014, both Stenhouse and Roush Fenway suffered through a dismal season. Stenhouse's best finish was a second-place showing at Bristol in the spring, a race won by teammate Carl Edwards, one of the few impressive showings by Roush in 2014. Stenhouse failed to qualify at Talladega in October and finished 27th in points.

After a slow start in 2015, Stenhouse nearly won the Food City 500, where he came home in fourth. After a weak summer, he had a consistent run of fifteenth or better in six of the last ten races, including two top-tens at Dover and Talladega. After poor performances at Martinsville and Phoenix, where he was as high as 22nd in the points standings, he fell to 25th at the season's end.

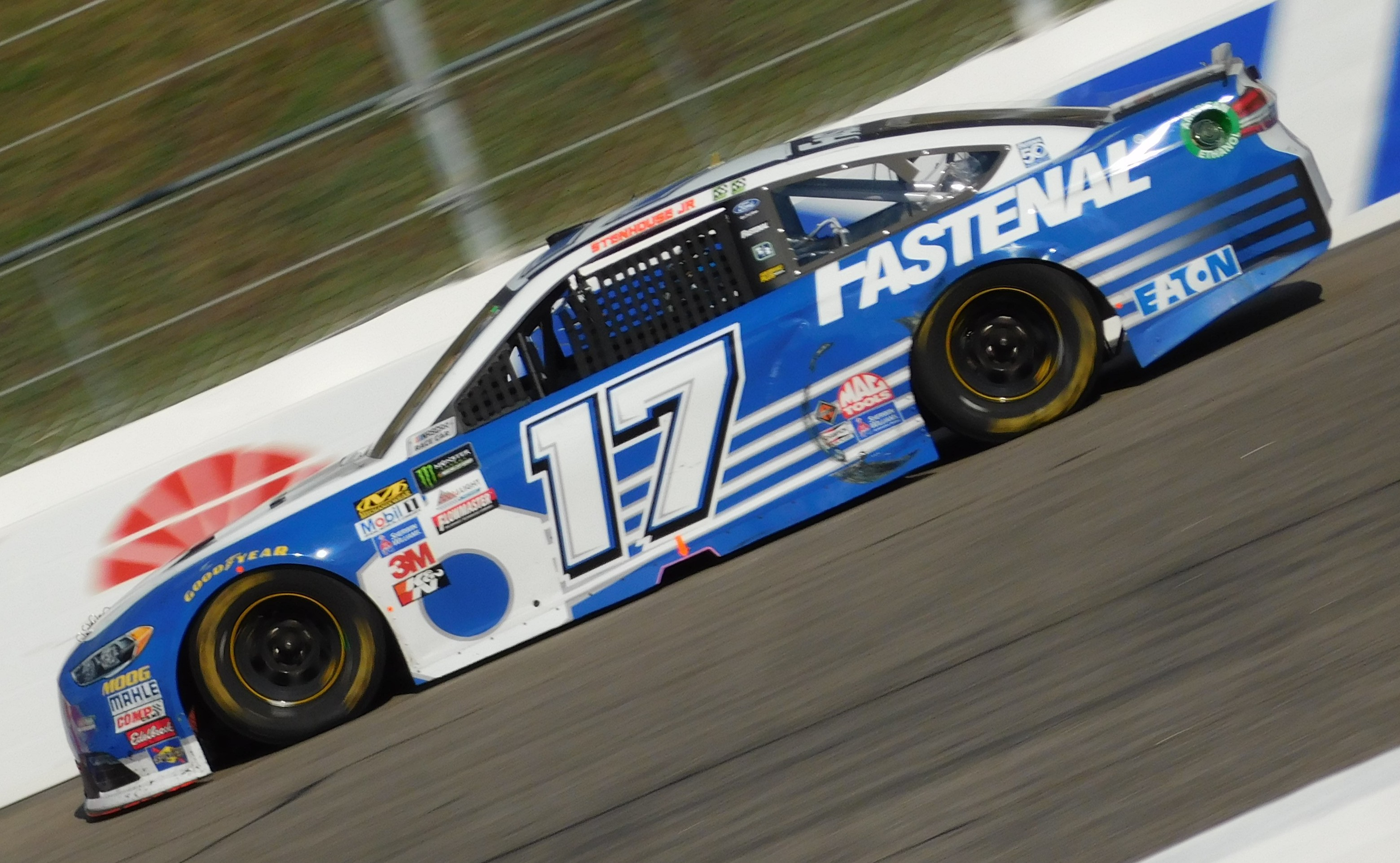
Stenhouse racing at New Hampshire Motor Speedway in 2017

Stenhouse got off to a better start in 2016 than in 2015, including a top-ten run in Atlanta. He got his next top-ten at California in 2015. It took 29 races to get two Top 10s in the year; it took five in 2016. On March 1, his team announced that Sunny D would be his sponsor in select Cup and Xfinity Series races. On August 21, 2016, Stenhouse recorded a then-career-best second-place finish in the Bass Pro Shops NRA Night Race at Bristol Motor Speedway.

After a gamble to stay out, Stenhouse restarted second with two to go at Phoenix on the Green-White-Checkered. He stacked up the line and caused Ryan Newman to cruise away to the finish. After a flat tire early on at Richmond, he rebounded to finish fourth. At Talladega's 2017 GEICO 500, Stenhouse won his second career Cup Series pole and his first since the 2013 Cup Series season. It was also RFR's first pole of the 2017 season. Stenhouse led the opening laps and then stayed mid-pack for the rest of the race. After Stenhouse avoided an eighteen-car pileup, he found himself in second place chasing Kyle Busch. After the final restart, Stenhouse passed Busch on the final lap for the win. It was his first Cup Series win, while RFR snapped its 101-race winless drought, dating back to Carl Edwards' victory in the 2014 Toyota/Save Mart 350 at Sonoma Raceway. Stenhouse later picked up his second victory of the year at Daytona in July, passing David Ragan with two to go, further solidifying his spot in the 2017 Playoffs. In the Playoffs, at Chicago he had a rough showing with a not so strong car and commitment line penalty which he ended up in 25th. In the next race at New Hampshire, he hit the wall on lap three but recovered to finish fifteenth on the lead lap to tie Austin Dillon on points for the last spot. At Dover in the elimination race, he struggled early, starting in fourteenth, falling back to 23rd and off the lead lap, but took a risk of staying on the lead lap and got a caution while in third place and finished fourth in Stage 1, getting seven stage points. He would not earn any stage points in Stage 2 but finished 19th while Ryan Newman finished thirteenth, which proved enough for Stenhouse, as he finished above Newman by two points for the last playoff spot in the Round of 12 and advanced to the second round of the playoffs. Stenhouse was eliminated in the second round after failing to perform well enough in the races.

2018 started with decent results for Stenhouse, as he had consistent runs throughout the season. However, at Daytona, Stenhouse was mainly to blame for two accidents, and he was caught up in three crashes, ultimately finishing seventeenth, after winning the first two stages, and receiving a security escort after the race. He dropped to eighteenth in the final point standings as he failed to visit victory lane, missed the playoffs, and recorded only five top-ten finishes.

On August 1, 2019, Stenhouse announced he signed a contract extension with Roush Fenway Racing through 2021. However, on September 25, Roush Fenway Racing announced that Stenhouse will be replaced by Chris Buescher in 2020, with Roush using an option in their contract with Buescher. In the aftermath of the sudden dismissal from the team, which was criticized by some members of the racing community (Including Kevin Harvick), Roush president Steve Newmark said that, after ten years with the team, the relationship with Stenhouse had "run its course."

==== 2020–present: JTG Daugherty Racing/Hyak Motorsports ====
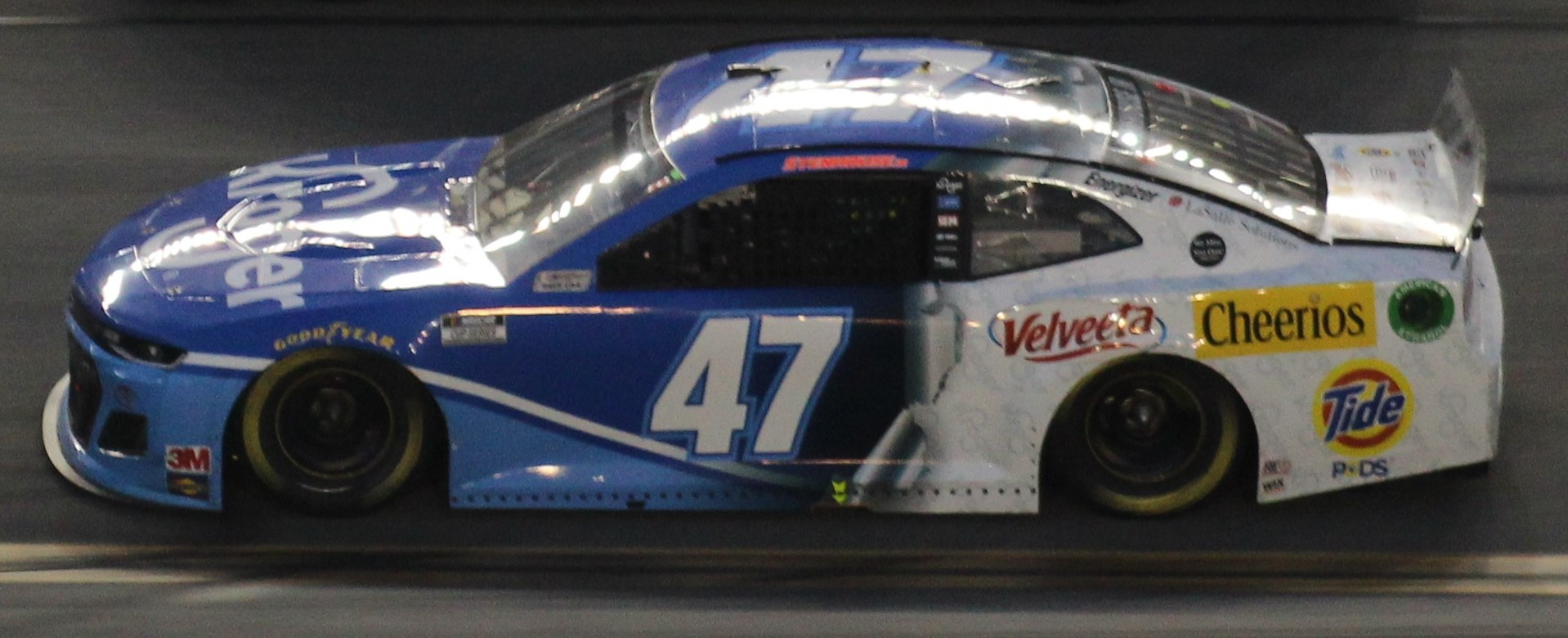
Stenhouse's No. 47 competing in the 2020 Daytona 500

On October 16, 2019, JTG Daugherty Racing announced Stenhouse would drive for them in 2020. On December 2, 2019, JTG Daugherty Racing announced that Stenhouse would be driving the 47 car, moving Ryan Preece to the 37.

On February 9, 2020, Stenhouse got off to a fast start by winning the pole for the Daytona 500.

Stenhouse Jr. narrowly lost the 2020 GEICO 500 to Ryan Blaney, spinning Aric Almirola about a hundred yards from the finish line, and nearly winning but coming up .007 short. Stenhouse scored three top-fives and four top-tens throughout the season, and all top-fives came in the first half of the regular season.

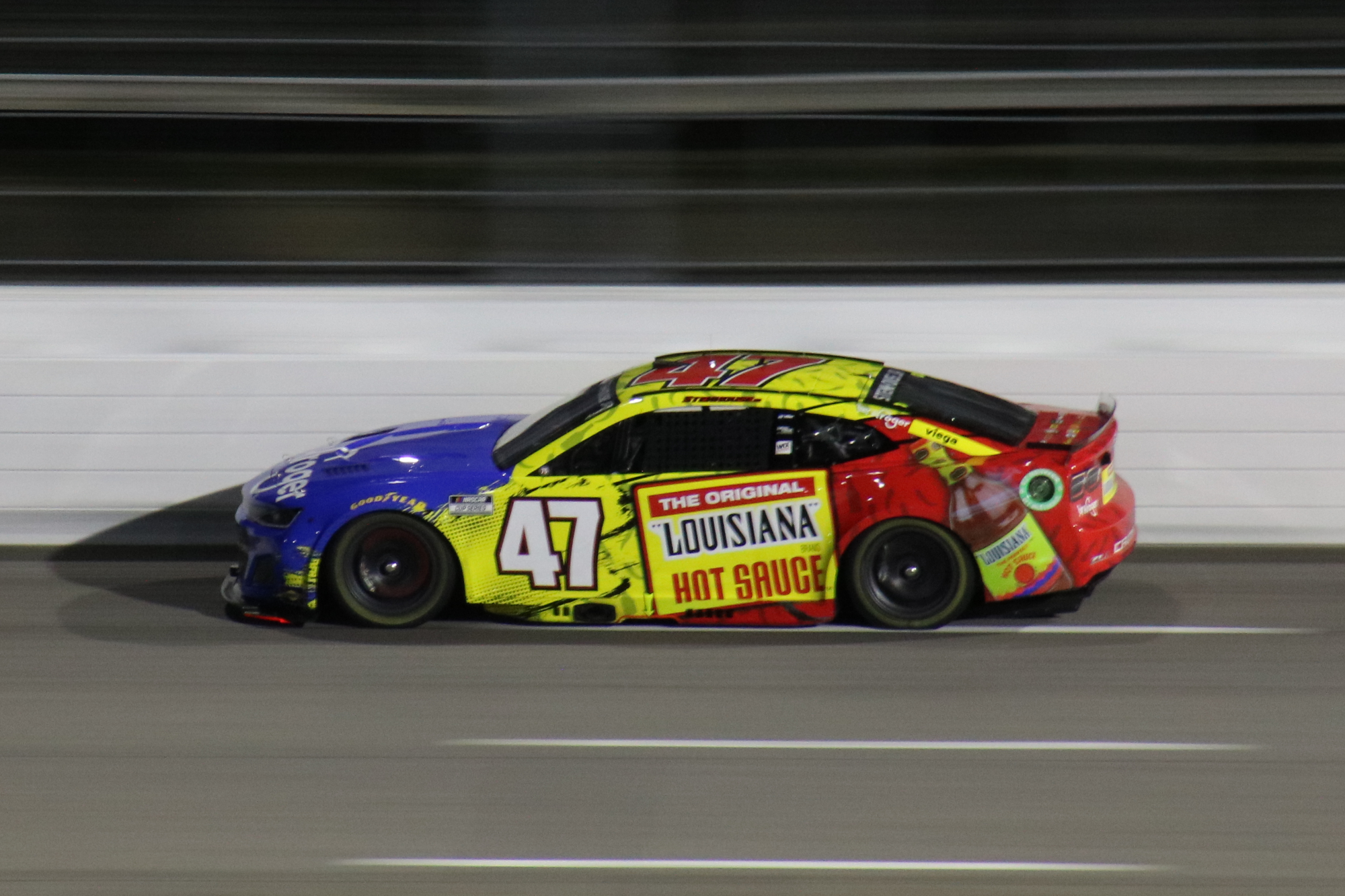
Stenhouse racing at Martinsville in 2022.

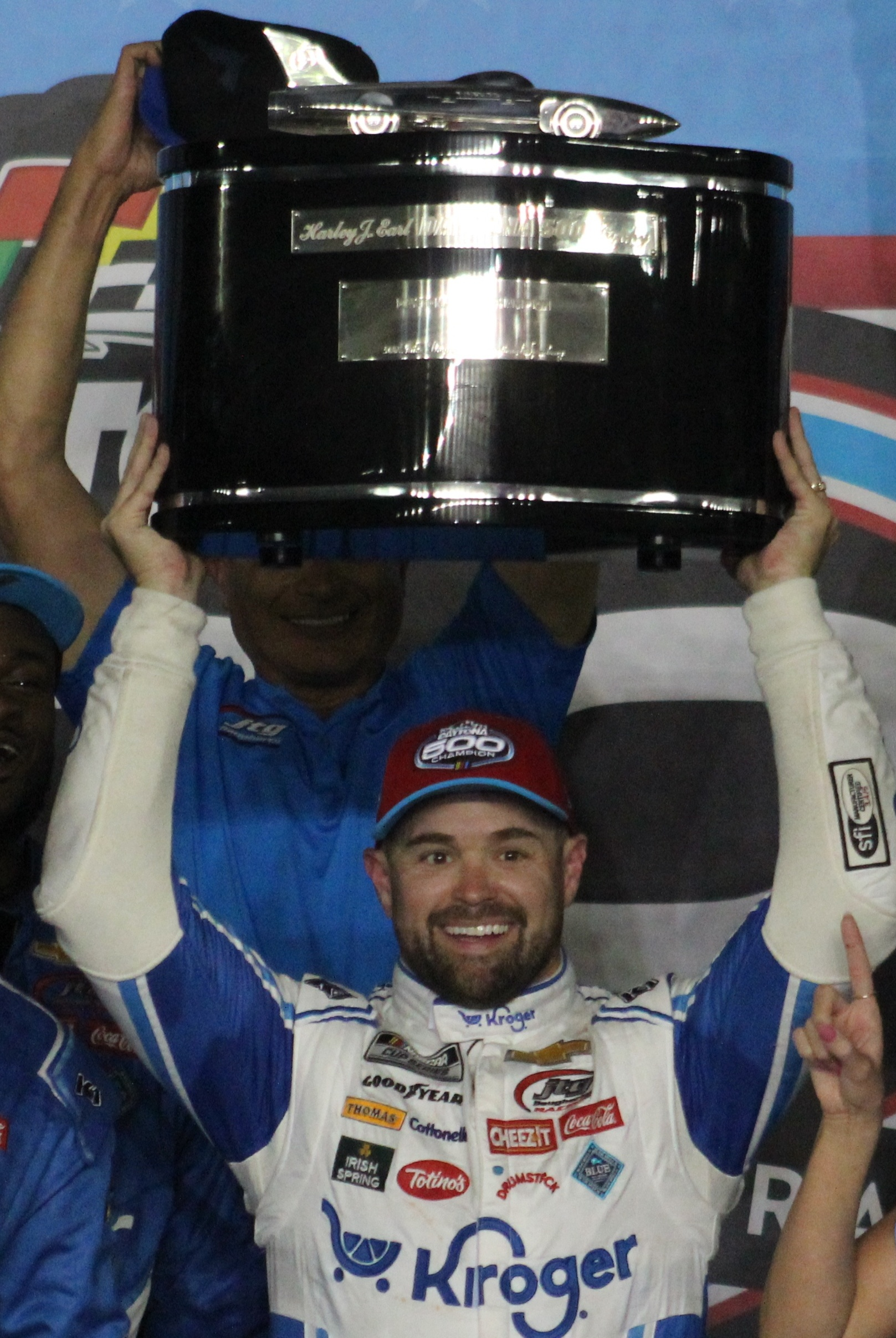
Stenhouse after winning the 2023 Daytona 500

Stenhouse started the 2023 season by winning the 2023 Daytona 500, his third career victory. This win put him in the playoffs for the first time since 2017. Stenhouse was eliminated after the Round of 16.

Stenhouse began the 2024 season with a 31st-place DNF at the 2024 Daytona 500. At the 2024 NASCAR All-Star Race, he was sent to the outside wall by Kyle Busch on lap 2. After the race, Stenhouse attacked Busch in the garage area, triggering a brawl between the drivers and their pit crews. NASCAR later fined Stenhouse US$75,000 for the incident; in addition, his father, Ricky Stenhouse Sr., was suspended indefinitely while team mechanic Clint Myrick was suspended for eight races and tuner Keith Matthews was suspended for four races for their involvement in the fight. Stenhouse Sr.'s suspension was lifted on September 24. Despite mediocre finishes that left him out of playoff contention, Stenhouse won at Talladega after beating Brad Keselowski by .006 seconds.

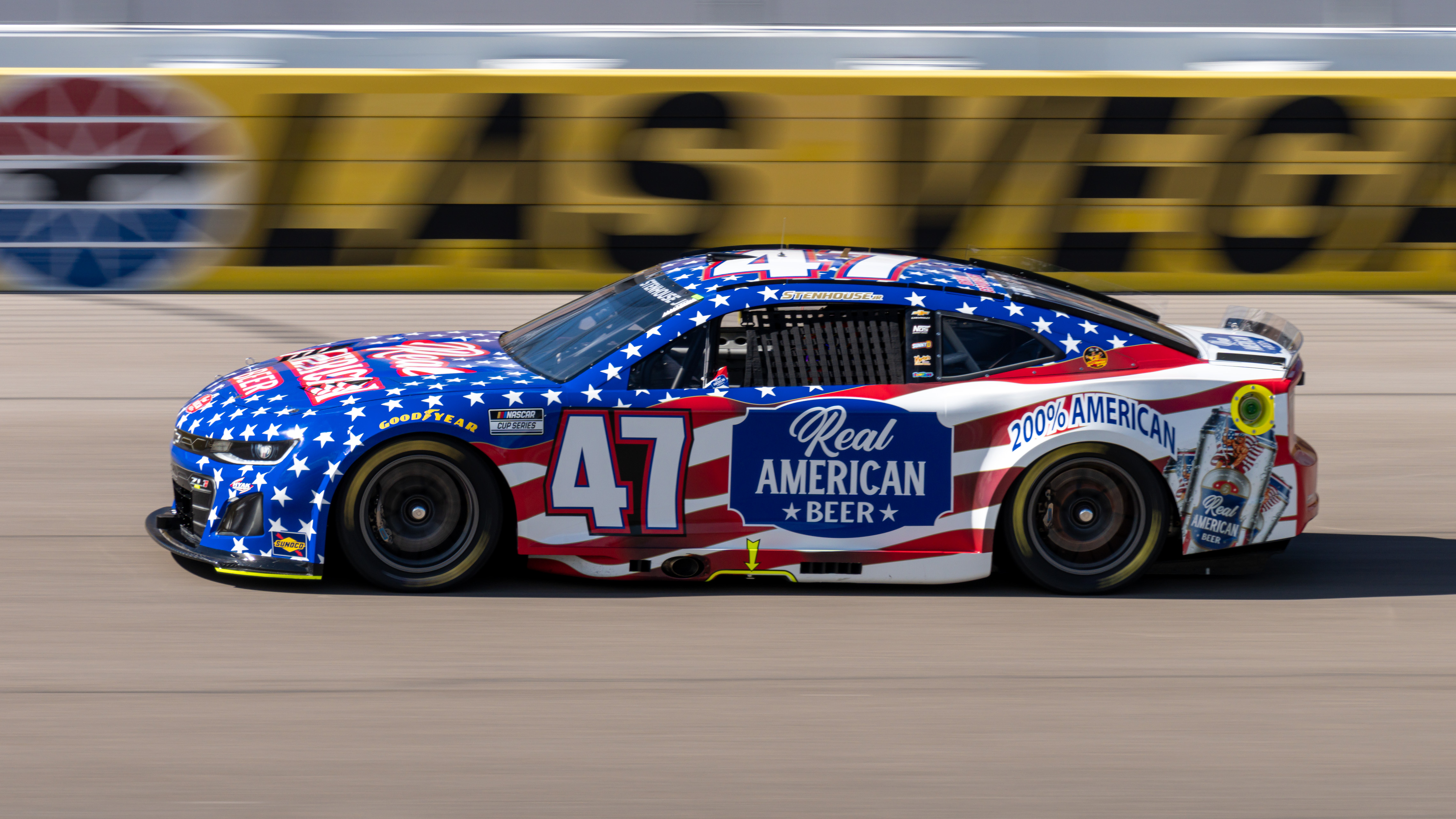
Stenhouse at Las Vegas in 2025

Before the 2025 season, JTG Daugherty Racing became Hyak Motorsports. Stenhouse began the season with an 18th-place finish at the 2025 Daytona 500. Despite a promising start to the season in which he scored ten top-20 finishes in the first 15 races and climbed as high as 13th in the points standings, he ultimately struggled during the latter half of the regular season, missing the playoffs and ending the season 30th in the final standings with only three top-ten finishes.

Stenhouse began the 2026 season with an 2nd-place finish at the 2026 Daytona 500. He signed a contract extension with Hyak Motorsports on May 11.

=== Sprint car and midget racing ===
Outside of NASCAR, Stenhouse is a car owner and part-time competitor in sprint car and midget racing. In 2012, he formed Stenhouse Jr. Racing and fielded the No. 41 car for Jason Johnson in the American Sprint Car Series (ASCS). In 2017, he partnered with Matt Wood to form Stenhouse Jr.-Wood Racing and fielded the No. 17 car for driver Joey Saldana in the World of Outlaws sprint car series.

After his first NASCAR Cup Series win at Talladega in May 2017, Stenhouse became one of only eight drivers to have won in the NASCAR Cup Series as well as in the USAC Silver Crown, National Sprint Car, and National Midget series, joining Mario Andretti, A. J. Foyt, Jeff Gordon, Kyle Larson, Ryan Newman, Ken Schrader, and Tony Stewart.

== Personal life ==
Stenhouse was born in Memphis, Tennessee, and was raised in Olive Branch, Mississippi. He is the first Mississippian driver to attempt a full-time schedule since Lake Speed in 1997. He started on dirt and then made a transition to stock cars in 2008.

Stenhouse is an Ole Miss Rebels football fan. In 2014, he led the Rebels onto the field before the annual Egg Bowl game versus in-state rival Mississippi State.

Stenhouse is a devout Baptist.

Stenhouse is a fan of classic country music.

Stenhouse was in a relationship with Danica Patrick from November 2012 to December 2017. In November 2021, Stenhouse announced his engagement to Madyson Goodfleisch, originally of Ashville, Ohio. They got married on October 26, 2022, in Charleston, South Carolina.

== In media ==
In 2016, Stenhouse competed on the show American Ninja Warrior which first aired on June 13; he did not make it past the second obstacle.

In June 2017, Stenhouse was a pit reporter for the Fox NASCAR broadcast of the Xfinity Series race at Pocono Raceway. A Cup drivers-only coverage, he worked alongside Erik Jones and Ryan Blaney.

== Motorsports career results ==
=== Stock car career summary ===
Season	Series	Team	Races	Wins	Top 5	Top 10	Points	Position
2008	ARCA Re/Max Series	Roush Fenway Racing	21	2	10	14	5155	4th
2009	NASCAR Nationwide Series	Roush Fenway Racing	8	0	1	2	677	62nd
2010	NASCAR Nationwide Series	Roush Fenway Racing	33	0	3	8	3419	16th
2011	NASCAR Cup Series	Wood Brothers Racing	1	0	0	0	0	NC†
2011	NASCAR Nationwide Series	Roush Fenway Racing	34	2	16	26	1222	**1st**
2012	NASCAR Cup Series	Roush Fenway Racing	4	0	0	0	0	NC†
2012	NASCAR Nationwide Series	Roush Fenway Racing	33	6	19	26	1251	**1st**
2013	NASCAR Cup Series	Roush Fenway Racing	36	0	1	3	909	19th
2013	NASCAR Nationwide Series	Roush Fenway Racing	1	0	0	0	0	NC†
2014	NASCAR Cup Series	Roush Fenway Racing	35	0	1	5	757	27th
2014	NASCAR K&N Pro Series West	Bill McAnally Racing	1	0	1	1	40	52nd
2015	NASCAR Cup Series	Roush Fenway Racing	36	0	1	3	712	25th
2016	NASCAR Cup Series	Roush Fenway Racing	36	0	4	6	772	21st
2016	NASCAR Xfinity Series	Roush Fenway Racing	1	0	1	1	0	NC†
2017	NASCAR Cup Series	Roush Fenway Racing	36	2	4	9	2222	13th
2018	NASCAR Cup Series	Roush Fenway Racing	36	0	3	5	701	18th
2019	NASCAR Cup Series	Roush Fenway Racing	36	0	1	3	679	23rd
2020	NASCAR Cup Series	JTG Daugherty Racing	36	0	3	4	584	24th
2021	NASCAR Cup Series	JTG Daugherty Racing	36	0	1	2	666	22nd
2022	NASCAR Cup Series	JTG Daugherty Racing	36	0	1	5	580	26th
2022	NASCAR Xfinity Series	Big Machine Racing	2	0	0	0	0	NC†
2023	NASCAR Cup Series	JTG Daugherty Racing	36	1	2	9	2168	16th
2024	NASCAR Cup Series	JTG Daugherty Racing	36	1	3	6	590	25th
2025	NASCAR Cup Series	Hyak Motorsports	36	0	1	3	562	30th

^{†} As Stenhouse Jr. was a guest driver, he was ineligible for championship points.

=== NASCAR ===
(key) (Bold – Pole position awarded by qualifying time. Italics – Pole position earned by points standings or practice time. * – Most laps led.)

==== Cup Series ====
NASCAR Cup Series results
Year	Team	No.	Make	1	2	3	4	5	6	7	8	9	10	11	12	13	14	15	16	17	18	19	20	21	22	23	24	25	26	27	28	29	30	31	32	33	34	35	36	NCSC	Pts	Ref
2011	Wood Brothers Racing	21	Ford	DAY	PHO	LVS	BRI	CAL	MAR	TEX	TAL	RCH	DAR	DOV	CLT; 11	KAN	POC	MCH	SON	DAY	KEN	NHA	IND	POC	GLN	MCH	BRI	ATL	RCH	CHI	NHA	DOV	KAN	CLT	TAL	MAR	TEX	PHO	HOM	54th	0^{1}	
2012	Roush Fenway Racing	6	Ford	DAY; 20	PHO	LVS	BRI	CAL	MAR	TEX	KAN	RCH	TAL	DAR	CLT	DOV	POC	MCH	SON	KEN	DAY	NHA	IND	POC	GLN	MCH	BRI	ATL	RCH	CHI	NHA	DOV; 12	TAL	CLT; 35	KAN	MAR	TEX	PHO	HOM; 39	61st	0^{1}	
2013	Roush Fenway Racing	17	Ford	DAY; 12	PHO; 16	LVS; 18	BRI; 16	CAL; 20	MAR; 25	TEX; 40	KAN; 11	RCH; 16	TAL; 13	DAR; 18	CLT; 14	DOV; 13	POC; 26	MCH; 16	SON; 27	KEN; 17	DAY; 11	NHA; 34	IND; 25	POC; 34	GLN; 18	MCH; 19	BRI; 18	**ATL**; 16	RCH; 10	CHI; 8	NHA; 24	DOV; 17	KAN; 30	CLT; 13	TAL; 3	MAR; 31	TEX; 16	PHO; 12	HOM; 22	19th	909	
2014	Roush Fenway Racing	17	Ford	DAY; 7	PHO; 18	LVS; 27	BRI; 2	CAL; 34	MAR; 40	TEX; 26	DAR; 20	RCH; 38	TAL; 10	KAN; 22	CLT; 26	DOV; 41	POC; 15	MCH; 27	SON; 31	KEN; 25	DAY; 41	NHA; 9	IND; 24	POC; 18	GLN; 20	MCH; 15	BRI; 6	ATL; 20	RCH; 26	CHI; 17	NHA; 39	DOV; 19	KAN; 19	CLT; 24	TAL; DNQ	MAR; 15	TEX; 23	PHO; 17	HOM; 22	27th	757	
2015	Roush Fenway Racing	17	Ford	DAY; 29	ATL; 36	LVS; 29	PHO; 12	CAL; 15	MAR; 40	TEX; 15	BRI; 4	RCH; 28	TAL; 26	KAN; 24	CLT; 37	DOV; 37	POC; 42	MCH; 25	SON; 20	DAY; 19	KEN; 11	NHA; 17	IND; 35	POC; 41	GLN; 34	MCH; 26	BRI; 21	DAR; 38	RCH; 16	CHI; 18	NHA; 13	DOV; 8	CLT; 14	KAN; 13	TAL; 9	MAR; 39	TEX; 21	PHO; 41	HOM; 22	25th	712	
2016	Roush Fenway Racing	17	Ford	DAY; 22	ATL; 10	LVS; 12	PHO; 37	CAL; 5	MAR; 32	TEX; 16	BRI; 16	RCH; 26	TAL; 16	KAN; 13	DOV; 14	CLT; 15	POC; 15	MCH; 29	SON; 26	DAY; 5	KEN; 40	NHA; 10	IND; 12	POC; 18	GLN; 38	BRI; 2	MCH; 27	DAR; 18	RCH; 18	CHI; 25	NHA; 24	DOV; 11	CLT; 20	KAN; 19	TAL; 5	MAR; 40	TEX; 16	PHO; 23	HOM; 30	21st	772	
2017	Roush Fenway Racing	17	Ford	DAY; 31	ATL; 13	LVS; 33	PHO; 4	CAL; 22	MAR; 10	TEX; 14	BRI; 9	RCH; 4	**TAL**; 1	KAN; 11	CLT; 15	DOV; 39	POC; 11	MCH; 8	SON; 38	DAY; 1	KEN; 14	NHA; 14	IND; 35	POC; 16	GLN; 20	MCH; 18	BRI; 14	DAR; 29	RCH; 19	CHI; 25	NHA; 15	DOV; 19	CLT; 13	TAL; 26	KAN; 29	MAR; 10	TEX; 12	PHO; 8	HOM; 15	13th	2222	
2018	Roush Fenway Racing	17	Ford	DAY; 29	ATL; 16	LVS; 14	PHO; 23	CAL; 18	MAR; 37	TEX; 25	BRI; 4	RCH; 23	TAL; 5	DOV; 15	KAN; 11	CLT; 10	POC; 14	MCH; 29	SON; 18	CHI; 16	DAY; 17*	KEN; 26	NHA; 30	POC; 22	GLN; 16	MCH; 18	BRI; 24	DAR; 12	IND; 34	LVS; 30	RCH; 13	ROV; 37	DOV; 9	TAL; 3	KAN; 20	MAR; 19	TEX; 11	PHO; 33	HOM; 16	18th	701	
2019	Roush Fenway Racing	17	Ford	DAY; 13	ATL; 18	LVS; 6	PHO; 13	CAL; 14	MAR; 25	TEX; 16	BRI; 33	RCH; 16	TAL; 25	DOV; 33	KAN; 11	CLT; 5	POC; 32	MCH; 19	SON; 21	CHI; 12	DAY; 24	KEN; 12	NHA; 36	POC; 21	GLN; 15	MCH; 28	BRI; 33	DAR; 33	IND; 31	LVS; 26	RCH; 15	ROV; 17	DOV; 16	TAL; 9	KAN; 16	MAR; 15	TEX; 40	PHO; 19	HOM; 19	23rd	679	
2020	JTG Daugherty Racing	47	Chevy	**DAY**; 20	LVS; 3	CAL; 20	PHO; 22	DAR; 40	DAR; 25	CLT; 24	CLT; 4	BRI; 34	ATL; 13	MAR; 21	HOM; 20	TAL; 2	POC; 17	POC; 15	IND; 36	KEN; 29	TEX; 38	KAN; 40	NHA; 14	MCH; 32	MCH; 19	DRC; 16	DOV; 10	DOV; 37	DAY; 32	DAR; 19	RCH; 18	BRI; 40	LVS; 23	TAL; 38	ROV; 17	KAN; 16	TEX; 12	MAR; 20	PHO; 27	24th	584	
2021	JTG Daugherty Racing	47	Chevy	DAY; 18	DRC; 18	HOM; 13	LVS; 11	PHO; 12	ATL; 12	BRD; 2	MAR; 15	RCH; 17	TAL; 33	KAN; 34	DAR; 20	DOV; 20	COA; 22	CLT; 12	SON; 37	NSH; 6	POC; 15	POC; 38	ROA; 12	ATL; 37	NHA; 15	GLN; 19	IRC; 11	MCH; 12	DAY; 22	DAR; 17	RCH; 23	BRI; 20	LVS; 17	TAL; 16	ROV; 21	TEX; 34	KAN; 24	MAR; 19	PHO; 36	22nd	666	
2022	JTG Daugherty Racing	47	Chevy	DAY; 28	CAL; 10	LVS; 21	PHO; 28	ATL; 31	COA; 37	RCH; 28	MAR; 27	BRD; 29	TAL; 30	DOV; 2	DAR; 8	KAN; 8	CLT; 7	GTW; 32	SON; 25	NSH; 16	ROA; 19	ATL; 31	NHA; 22	POC; 18	IRC; 13	MCH; 33	RCH; 22	GLN; 15	DAY; 22	DAR; 35	KAN; 30	BRI; 33	TEX; 27	TAL; 22	ROV; 19	LVS; 23	HOM; 15	MAR; 22	PHO; 32	26th	580	
2023	JTG Daugherty Racing	47	Chevy	DAY; 1	CAL; 12	LVS; 24	PHO; 19	ATL; 17	COA; 7	RCH; 35	BRD; 4	MAR; 8	TAL; 15	DOV; 15	KAN; 12	DAR; 13	CLT; 7	GTW; 32	SON; 12	NSH; 22	CSC; 34	ATL; 10	NHA; 18	POC; 7	RCH; 17	MCH; 21	IRC; 25	GLN; 13	DAY; 34	DAR; 16	KAN; 23	BRI; 10	TEX; 9	TAL; 22	ROV; 34	LVS; 25	HOM; 27	MAR; 19	PHO; 23	16th	2168	
2024	JTG Daugherty Racing	47	Chevy	DAY; 31	ATL; 6	LVS; 17	PHO; 21	BRI; 33	COA; 28	RCH; 33	MAR; 29	TEX; 23	TAL; 4	DOV; 35	KAN; 16	DAR; 23	CLT; 31	GTW; 20	SON; 24	IOW; 5	NHA; 7	NSH; 30	CSC; 6	POC; 33	IND; 11	RCH; 36	MCH; 13	DAY; 33	DAR; 22	ATL; 14	GLN; 37	BRI; 27	KAN; 28	TAL; 1	ROV; 16	LVS; 27	HOM; 21	MAR; 20	PHO; 33	25th	590	
2025	Hyak Motorsports	47	Chevy	DAY; 18	ATL; 5	COA; 18	PHO; 21	LVS; 18	HOM; 24	MAR; 20	DAR; 25	BRI; 22	TAL; 12	TEX; 6	KAN; 19	CLT; 11	NSH; 39	MCH; 20	MXC; 27	POC; 30	ATL; 6	CSC; 31	SON; 33	DOV; 23	IND; 35	IOW; 33	GLN; 23	RCH; 23	DAY; 35	DAR; 30	GTW; 20	BRI; 22	NHA; 25	KAN; 35	ROV; 19	LVS; 14	TAL; 38	MAR; 27	PHO; 17	30th	562	
2026	Hyak Motorsports	47	Chevy	DAY; 2	ATL; 36	COA; 28	PHO; 22	LVS; 29	DAR; 29	MAR; 30	BRI; 17	KAN; 21	TAL; 6	TEX; 19	GLN; 31	CLT; 12	NSH; 4	MCH; 29	POC; 15	COR; 33	SON; 21	CHI; 26	ATL; 23	NWS; 34	IND; 20	IOW; 18	RCH; 31	NHA; 28	DAY; 5	DAR; 35	GTW; 26	BRI; 30	KAN; 32	LVS; 32	CLT; 23	PHO; 30	TAL; 3	MAR; 30	HOM; 32	28th	527	

===== Daytona 500 =====
Year	Team	Manufacturer	Start	Finish
2012	Roush Fenway Racing	Ford	20	20
2013	Roush Fenway Racing	Ford	28	12
2014	Roush Fenway Racing	Ford	34	7
2015	Roush Fenway Racing	Ford	32	29
2016	Roush Fenway Racing	Ford	19	22
2017	Roush Fenway Racing	Ford	23	31
2018	Roush Fenway Racing	Ford	9	29
2019	Roush Fenway Racing	Ford	5	13
2020	JTG Daugherty Racing	Chevrolet	**1**	20
2021	JTG Daugherty Racing	Chevrolet	21	18
2022	JTG Daugherty Racing	Chevrolet	18	28
2023	JTG Daugherty Racing	Chevrolet	31	**1**
2024	JTG Daugherty Racing	Chevrolet	35	31
2025	Hyak Motorsports	Chevrolet	31	18
2026	Hyak Motorsports	Chevrolet	16	2

==== Xfinity Series ====
NASCAR Xfinity Series results
Year	Team	No.	Make	1	2	3	4	5	6	7	8	9	10	11	12	13	14	15	16	17	18	19	20	21	22	23	24	25	26	27	28	29	30	31	32	33	34	35	NXSC	Pts	Ref
2009	Roush Fenway Racing	16	Ford	DAY	CAL	LVS	BRI	TEX	NSH; 23	PHO	TAL	RCH	DAR	CLT	DOV	NSH; 32	KEN; 9	MLW; 5	NHA	DAY	CHI	GTW; 30	IRP; QL^{†}	**IOW**; 22	GLN	MCH	BRI	CGV	ATL	RCH	DOV	KAN	CAL		MEM; QL^{†}	TEX	PHO	HOM	62nd	677	
2009	Roush Fenway Racing	17	Ford																															CLT; 40					62nd	677	
2010	Roush Fenway Racing	6	Ford	DAY; 36	CAL; 39	LVS; 30	BRI; 25	NSH; 31	PHO; 9	TEX; 29	TAL; 29	RCH; 20	DAR; 37	DOV; 18	CLT; 40	NSH; DNQ	KEN	ROA; 26	NHA; 16	DAY; 3	CHI; 19	GTW; 9	IRP; 11	IOW; 14	GLN	MCH; 13	BRI; 22	CGV; 24	ATL; 10	RCH; 4	DOV; 11	KAN; 6	CAL; 29	CLT; 14	GTW; 23	TEX; 11	PHO; 9	HOM; 4	16th	3419	
2011	Roush Fenway Racing	6	Ford	DAY; 8	PHO; 7	LVS; 8	**BRI**; 14	CAL; 4	TEX; 8	TAL; 38	NSH; 5	RCH; 21	DAR; 10	DOV; 4	IOW; 1	**CLT**; 4	CHI; 14	MCH; 2	ROA; 8	DAY; 27	KEN; 9	NHA; 4	NSH; 2	**IRP**; 3*	IOW; 1	GLN; 15	CGV; 26	BRI; 11	ATL; 3	RCH; 3	CHI; 8	DOV; 5	KAN; 5	CLT; 9	TEX; 6	PHO; 5	HOM; 2		1st	1222	
2012	Roush Fenway Racing	6	Ford	DAY; 19	PHO; 3	LVS; 1*	BRI; 6	CAL; 2	TEX; 1	RCH; 4	TAL; 3	**DAR**; 6	IOW; 1*	CLT; 26	DOV; 32	MCH; 25	ROA; 11	KEN; 8	**DAY**; 2	NHA; 5	**CHI**; 2*	IND; 9	IOW; 5	GLN; 4	CGV; 12	BRI; 2	ATL; 1	**RCH**; 2	CHI; 1	KEN; 17	DOV; 9	CLT; 7	KAN; 1	TEX; 4	PHO; 3	HOM; 6			1st	1251	
2013	Roush Fenway Racing	16	Ford	DAY	PHO	LVS	BRI	CAL	TEX	RCH	TAL	DAR	CLT	DOV	IOW	MCH	ROA	KEN	DAY	NHA	CHI	IND	IOW	GLN	MOH	BRI	ATL	RCH	CHI	KEN	DOV	KAN	CLT	TEX; 17	PHO	HOM			115th	0^{1}	
2016	Roush Fenway Racing	60	Ford	DAY	ATL	LVS	PHO	CAL	TEX	BRI	RCH	TAL	DOV	CLT	POC	MCH	IOW	DAY	KEN	NHA	IND	IOW	GLN	MOH	BRI	ROA	DAR	RCH	CHI	KEN	DOV	CLT	KAN	TEX	PHO; 3	HOM			99th	0^{1}	
2022	Big Machine Racing	48	Chevy	DAY	CAL	LVS	PHO	ATL	COA	RCH	MAR	TAL	DOV	DAR	TEX	CLT	PIR	NSH	ROA	ATL	NHA	POC; 34	IRC	MCH	GLN	DAY; 27	DAR	KAN	BRI	TEX	TAL	ROV	LVS	HOM	MAR	PHO			104th	0^{1}	
^{†} – Qualified for Matt Kenseth

==== Craftsman Truck Series ====
NASCAR Craftsman Truck Series results
Year	Team	No.	Make	1	2	3	4	5	6	7	8	9	10	11	12	13	14	15	16	17	18	19	20	21	22	23	24	25	NCTC	Pts	Ref
2026	Niece Motorsports	45	Chevy	DAY; 6	ATL; 9	STP	DAR	CAR																					105th	0^{1}	
2026	Niece Motorsports	4	Chevy						BRI; 26	TEX	GLN	DOV	CLT; 9	NSH															105th	0^{1}	
2026	Niece Motorsports	42	Chevy												MCH; 7	COR	LRP	NWS	IRP	RCH	NHA	BRI	KAN	CLT	PHO	TAL	MAR	HOM	105th	0^{1}	

^{*} Season still in progress
^{1} Ineligible for series points

=== ARCA Re/Max Series ===
(key) (Bold – Pole position awarded by qualifying time. Italics – Pole position earned by points standings or practice time. * – Most laps led.)

ARCA Re/Max Series results
Year	Team	No.	Make	1	2	3	4	5	6	7	8	9	10	11	12	13	14	15	16	17	18	19	20	21	ARMC	Pts	Ref
2008	Roush Fenway Racing	99	Ford	DAY; 25	SLM; 6	IOW; 19	KAN; 2	CAR; 3	KEN; 1	TOL; 7	POC; 1*	MCH; 2	CAY; 3*	KEN; 13	BLN; 7	POC; 30	NSH; 7	ISF; 2	**DSF**; 5	**CHI**; 2*	**SLM**; 17	NJM; 2	TAL; 28	TOL; 25	4th	5155	

==== K&N Pro Series West ====
NASCAR K&N Pro Series West results
Year	Team	No.	Make	1	2	3	4	5	6	7	8	9	10	11	12	13	14	NKNPSWC	Pts	Ref
2014	Bill McAnally Racing	99	Ford	PHO	IRW	S99	IOW	KCR	SON; 4	SLS	CNS	IOW	EVG	KCR	MMP	AAS	PHO	52nd	40	

Sporting positions
Preceded by Brad Keselowski	NASCAR Nationwide Series Champion; 2011, 2012	Succeeded by Austin Dillon
Preceded by Austin Cindric	Daytona 500 Winner; 2023	Succeeded by William Byron
Achievements
Preceded by Justin Allgaier	NASCAR Nationwide Series Rookie of the Year; 2010	Succeeded by Timmy Hill
Preceded by Stephen Leicht	NASCAR Sprint Cup Series Rookie of the Year; 2013	Succeeded by Kyle Larson
