= Tanner Thorson =

American racing driver

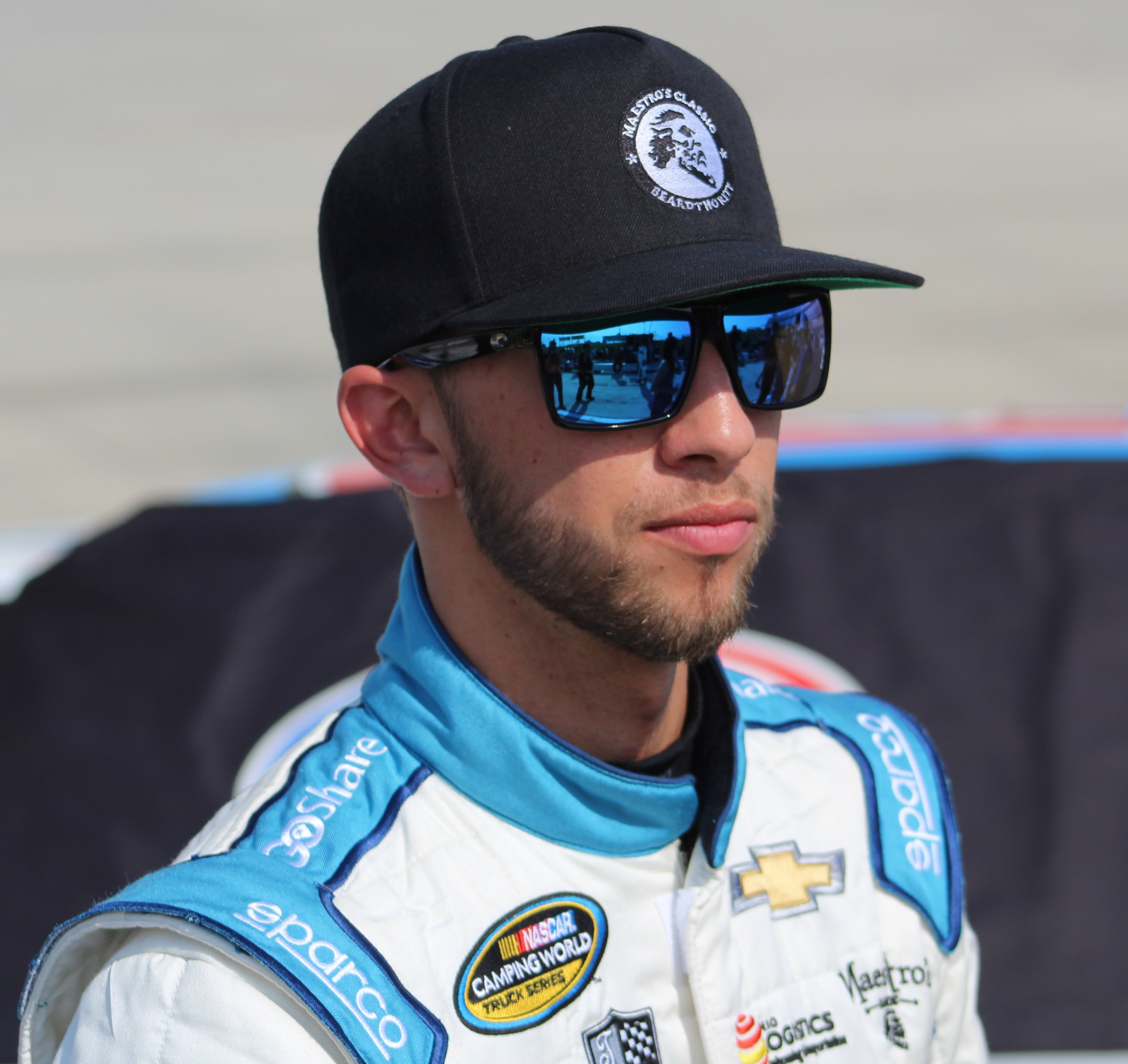
- Thorson at Dover International Speedway in 2018
- Born: Tanner Delbert Thorson; May 7, 1996 (age 30); Minden, Nevada, U.S.
- Achievements: 2022 Chili Bowl Nationals Winner; 2016 USAC National Midget Champion; 2015 Turkey Night Grand Prix Winner

NASCAR FedEx Freight Truck Series career
- 11 races run over 1 year
- 2018 position: 25th
- Best finish: 25th (2018)
- First race: 2018 JEGS 200 (Dover)
- Last race: 2018 Ford EcoBoost 200 (Homestead)
Wins	Top tens	Poles
0	0	0
- Statistics up to date as of September 4, 2019.

Tanner Delbert Thorson (born May 7, 1996 in Minden, Nevada) is an American professional dirt track racing driver. He competes in the United States Auto Club (USAC) and High Limit Racing. Thorson has also competed in the NASCAR Camping World Truck Series, last driving the Nos. 12 and 20 Chevrolet Silverados for Young's Motorsports in 2018.

== Racing career ==
=== USAC racing ===
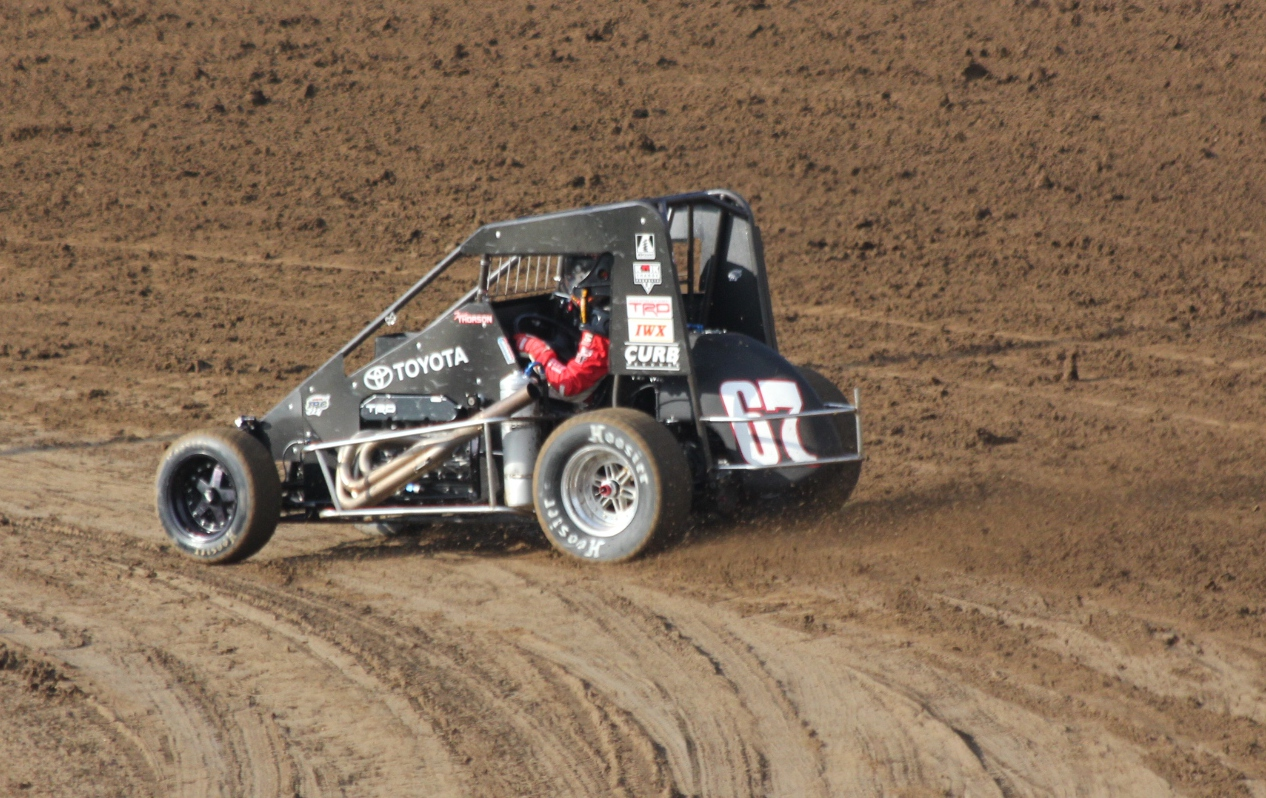
Thorson's 2014 USAC Midget at Angell Park Speedway

Thorson raced in the USAC Midget National Tour for many years. He won the 2016 USAC National Midget Series championship on the strength of 17 wins. A highlight of the season was winning the Gold Crown Midget Nationals at Tri-City Speedway. He also made some starts in asphalt Late Models and an ARCA start on the dirt at the Springfield Mile. Thorson began USAC Sprint Car racing in 2021 and ran for the Rookie of the Year. He won his first USAC wingless Sprint Car feature on April 23, 2021 at Big Diamond Speedway in his thirteenth start. Thorson won his fifth feature USAC Midget win of the season on August 5, 2021 at Bridgeport Speedway. It was Thorson's 25th career win, which put him in 16th place on the all-time wins list.

On January 16, 2022, Thorson beat Christopher Bell to claim his first Chili Bowl Nationals win.

=== Camping World Truck Series ===
In 2018, it was announced that Thorson would drive the No. 20 truck for Young's Motorsports in conjunction with Team Dillon Racing for the majority of the 2018 NCWTS schedule.

== Personal life ==
Thorson married Shaylee Smith in 2022. Smith’s father, Stevie Smith, a former World of Outlaws racer.

The couple have two children and reside in Broken Arrow, Oklahoma.

== Motorsports career results ==
=== NASCAR ===
(key) (Bold – Pole position awarded by qualifying time. Italics – Pole position earned by points standings or practice time. * – Most laps led.)

==== Camping World Truck Series ====
NASCAR Camping World Truck Series results
Year	Team	No.	Make	1	2	3	4	5	6	7	8	9	10	11	12	13	14	15	16	17	18	19	20	21	22	23	NCWTC	Pts	Ref
2018	Young's Motorsports	20	Chevy	DAY	ATL	LVS	MAR	DOV; 16	KAN	CLT	TEX	IOW; 13	GTW	CHI	KEN	ELD; 19	POC; 15	MCH	BRI; 14	MSP	LVS; 32		MAR; 31	TEX; 21	PHO; 18	HOM; 29	25th	172	
2018	Young's Motorsports	12	Chevy																			TAL; 31					25th	172	

==== K&N Pro Series East ====
NASCAR K&N Pro Series East results
Year	Team	No.	Make	1	2	3	4	5	6	7	8	9	10	11	12	13	14	NKNPSEC	Pts	Ref
2018	Young's Motorsports	28	Chevy	NSM	BRI; 23	LGY	SBO	SBO	MEM	NJM	TMP	NHA	IOW	GLN	GTW	NHA	DOV	59th	21	

^{*} Season still in progress
^{1} Ineligible for series points

=== ARCA Racing Series ===
(key) (Bold – Pole position awarded by qualifying time. Italics – Pole position earned by points standings or practice time. * – Most laps led.)

ARCA Racing Series results
Year	Team	No.	Make	1	2	3	4	5	6	7	8	9	10	11	12	13	14	15	16	17	18	19	20	ARSC	Pts	Ref
2016	Venturini Motorsports	55	Toyota	DAY	NSH	SLM	TAL	TOL	NJE	POC	MCH	MAD	WIN	IOW	IRP	POC	BLN	ISF; 12	DSF	SLM	CHI	KEN	KAN	108th	170	
2017	Venturini Motorsports	25	Toyota	DAY	NSH	SLM	TAL	TOL	ELK	POC	MCH	MAD; 10	IOW	IRP	POC	WIN	ISF	ROA						63rd	320	
2017	Venturini Motorsports	15	Toyota																DSF; 19	SLM	CHI	KEN	KAN	63rd	320	

=== CARS Super Late Model Tour ===
(key)

CARS Super Late Model Tour results
Year	Team	No.	Make	1	2	3	4	5	6	7	8	9	10	CSLMTC	Pts	Ref
2016	David Gilliland Racing	97T	Toyota	SNM	ROU	HCY	TCM	GRE	ROU; 3	CON; 5	MYB	HCY	SNM	27th	58	
