= 2020 Daytona 500 =

62nd Running of the event, held in Daytona Beach, Florida

Race details
- Race 1 of 36 in the 2020 NASCAR Cup Series
- Date: February 16–17, 2020
- Location: Daytona International Speedway in Daytona Beach, Florida
- Course: Permanent racing facility 2.5 mi (4 km)
- Distance: 209 laps, 522.5 mi (836 km)
- Scheduled distance: 200 laps, 500 mi (800 km)
- Average speed: 141.11 miles per hour (227.09 km/h)

Pole position
Driver	Ricky Stenhouse Jr.	JTG Daugherty Racing
- Time: 46.253

Qualifying race winners
Duel 1 Winner	Joey Logano	Team Penske
Duel 2 Winner	William Byron	Hendrick Motorsports

Most laps led
Driver	Denny Hamlin	Joe Gibbs Racing
- Laps: 79

Winner
No. 11	Denny Hamlin	Joe Gibbs Racing

Television in the United States
- Network: Fox
- Announcers: Mike Joy and Jeff Gordon
- Nielsen ratings: 7.330 million

Radio in the United States
- Radio: MRN
- Booth announcers: Alex Hayden, Jeff Striegle and Rusty Wallace
- Turn announcers: Dave Moody (1 & 2), Mike Bagley (Backstretch) and Kyle Rickey (3 & 4)

The 2020 Daytona 500, the 62nd running of the event, was a NASCAR Cup Series race held on February 16–17, 2020. It was contested over 209 laps—extended from 200 laps due to an overtime finish, on the 2.5-mile (4.0 km) asphalt superspeedway. It was the first race of the 2020 NASCAR Cup Series season.

The race was started by President of the United States Donald Trump, who served as Grand Marshal, and the opening lap was paced by the official Presidential state car. WWE professional wrestler Sheamus drove the pace car for the opening laps, and Dale Earnhardt Jr., two-time winner of the Daytona 500, waved the green flag to officially start the race.

The race was scheduled for February 16, but persistent rain showers caused the race to be suspended on lap 20 and postponed until 4 p.m. the following day, the second time the race has had to be postponed due to rain. The first time was in 2012. This was the final Daytona 500 starts for Clint Bowyer, Reed Sorenson, Brendan Gaughan, Leavine Family Racing, Premium Motorsports, and Germain Racing.

The program cover for the 2020 Daytona 500.

Most of the race was cleanly run until lap 185, when The Big One struck, triggering a massive crash involving at least 20 cars on the backstretch. The race was red-flagged as a result. Denny Hamlin won the race by 0.014 seconds over Ryan Blaney on the second restart in overtime after Blaney accidentally spun Ryan Newman into the outside wall coming to the finish line. Newman was hit by Corey Lajoie around the window net and had to be cut from his car. Chris Buescher, David Ragan, and Kevin Harvick rounded out the top five. Newman was immediately rushed to a local hospital after the crash. Two hours later, it was announced he was seriously injured in the crash, but his injuries were not believed to be life-threatening. Newman was released from the hospital on Wednesday, February 19, and would return to racing at the 2020 The Real Heroes 400. In the days that followed, many news outlets credit Newman's miraculous survival of his crash to the safety features implemented by NASCAR following the death of Dale Earnhardt at the end of the 2001 Daytona 500.

== Report ==
Daytona International Speedway is a race track in Daytona Beach, Florida that is one of six superspeedways, the others being Auto Club Speedway, Pocono Raceway, Indianapolis Motor Speedway, Michigan International Speedway, and Talladega Superspeedway.

=== Background ===
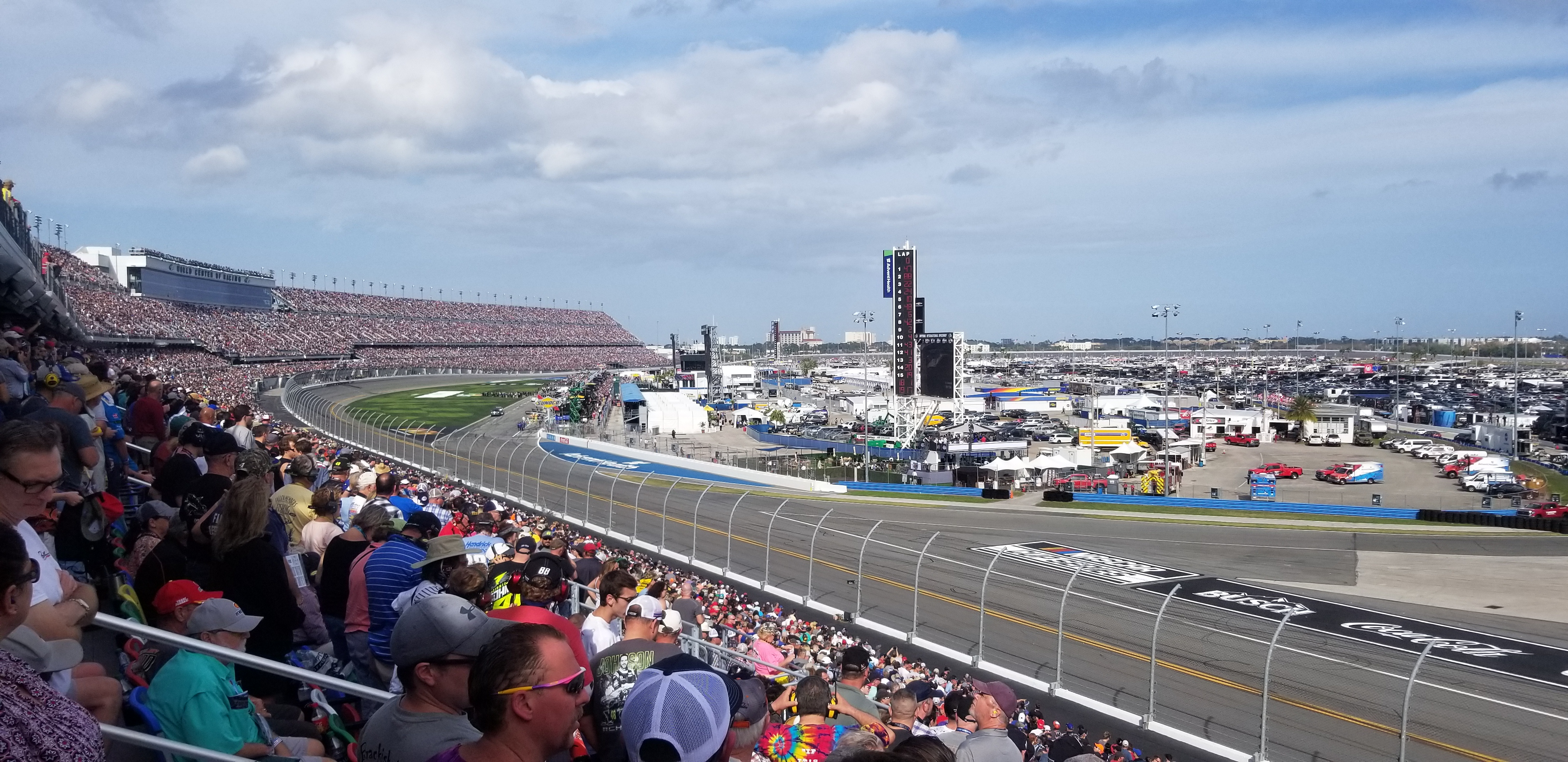
Daytona International Speedway, the circuit where the 62nd annual Daytona 500 took place. The first twenty laps were raced on Sunday afternoon and the remaining laps (including the green-white-checkered finish) were completed on Monday evening.

Daytona International Speedway is one of three superspeedways to hold NASCAR races, the other two being Indianapolis Motor Speedway and Talladega Superspeedway. The standard track at Daytona International Speedway is a four-turn superspeedway that is 2.5 miles (4.0 km) long. The track's turns are banked at 31 degrees, while the front stretch, the location of the finish line, is banked at 18 degrees.

=== Entry list ===
- (W) denotes past 500 winner.
- (R) denotes rookie driver.
- (i) denotes driver who are ineligible for series driver points.

No.	Driver	Team	Manufacturer
00	Quin Houff (R)	StarCom Racing	Chevrolet
1	Kurt Busch (W)	Chip Ganassi Racing	Chevrolet
2	Brad Keselowski	Team Penske	Ford
3	Austin Dillon (W)	Richard Childress Racing	Chevrolet
4	Kevin Harvick (W)	Stewart-Haas Racing	Ford
6	Ryan Newman (W)	Roush Fenway Racing	Ford
8	Tyler Reddick (R)	Richard Childress Racing	Chevrolet
9	Chase Elliott	Hendrick Motorsports	Chevrolet
10	Aric Almirola	Stewart-Haas Racing	Ford
11	Denny Hamlin (W)	Joe Gibbs Racing	Toyota
12	Ryan Blaney	Team Penske	Ford
13	Ty Dillon	Germain Racing	Chevrolet
14	Clint Bowyer	Stewart-Haas Racing	Ford
15	Brennan Poole (R)	Premium Motorsports	Chevrolet
16	Justin Haley (i)	Kaulig Racing	Chevrolet
17	Chris Buescher	Roush Fenway Racing	Ford
18	Kyle Busch	Joe Gibbs Racing	Toyota
19	Martin Truex Jr.	Joe Gibbs Racing	Toyota
20	Erik Jones	Joe Gibbs Racing	Toyota
21	Matt DiBenedetto	Wood Brothers Racing	Ford
22	Joey Logano (W)	Team Penske	Ford
24	William Byron	Hendrick Motorsports	Chevrolet
27	Reed Sorenson	Premium Motorsports	Chevrolet
32	Corey LaJoie	Go Fas Racing	Ford
34	Michael McDowell	Front Row Motorsports	Ford
36	David Ragan	Rick Ware Racing	Ford
37	Ryan Preece	JTG Daugherty Racing	Chevrolet
38	John Hunter Nemechek (R)	Front Row Motorsports	Ford
41	Cole Custer (R)	Stewart-Haas Racing	Ford
42	Kyle Larson	Chip Ganassi Racing	Chevrolet
43	Bubba Wallace	Richard Petty Motorsports	Chevrolet
47	Ricky Stenhouse Jr.	JTG Daugherty Racing	Chevrolet
48	Jimmie Johnson (W)	Hendrick Motorsports	Chevrolet
49	Chad Finchum (i)	MBM Motorsports	Toyota
51	Joey Gase (i)	Petty Ware Racing	Chevrolet
52	B. J. McLeod (i)	Rick Ware Racing	Ford
54	J. J. Yeley (i)	Rick Ware Racing	Ford
62	Brendan Gaughan (i)	Beard Motorsports	Chevrolet
66	Timmy Hill (i)	MBM Motorsports	Ford
77	Ross Chastain (i)	Spire Motorsports	Chevrolet
88	Alex Bowman	Hendrick Motorsports	Chevrolet
95	Christopher Bell (R)	Leavine Family Racing	Toyota
96	Daniel Suárez	Gaunt Brothers Racing	Toyota
Official entry list

== Practice ==
=== First practice (February 8) ===
Ty Dillon was the fastest in the first practice session with a time of 44.206 seconds and a speed of 203.592 mph (327.650 km/h).

Pos	No.	Driver	Team	Manufacturer	Time	Speed
1	13	Ty Dillon	Germain Racing	Chevrolet	44.206	203.592
2	47	Ricky Stenhouse Jr.	JTG Daugherty Racing	Chevrolet	44.293	203.192
3	11	Denny Hamlin	Joe Gibbs Racing	Toyota	44.404	202.684
Official first practice results

=== Second practice (February 8) ===
Bubba Wallace was the fastest in the second practice session with a time of 45.878 seconds and a speed of 196.172 mph (315.708 km/h).

Pos	No.	Driver	Team	Manufacturer	Time	Speed
1	43	Bubba Wallace	Richard Petty Motorsports	Chevrolet	45.878	196.172
2	41	Cole Custer (R)	Stewart-Haas Racing	Ford	45.893	196.108
3	38	John Hunter Nemechek (R)	Front Row Motorsports	Ford	45.909	196.040
Official second practice results

== Qualifying ==
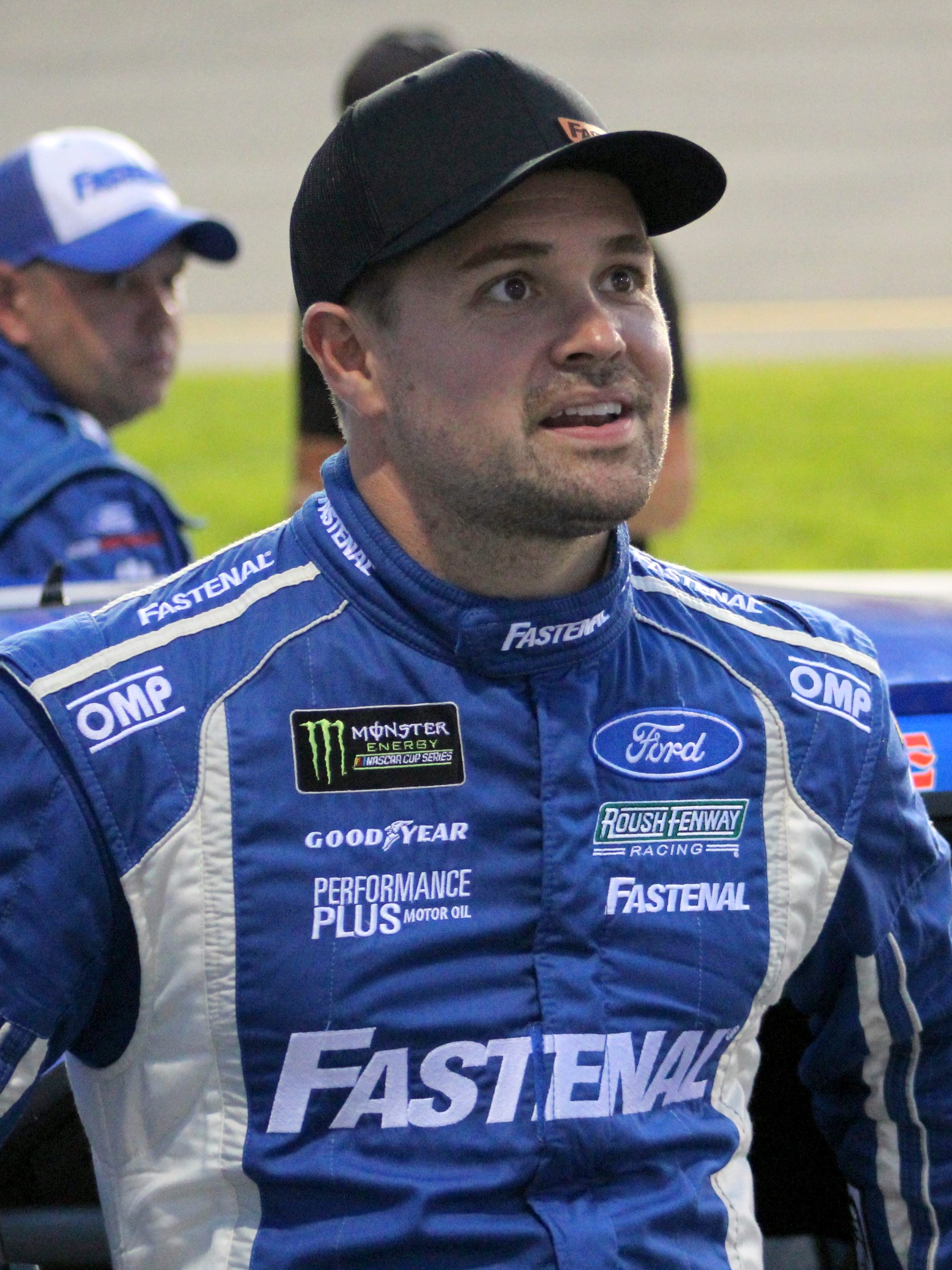
Ricky Stenhouse Jr. scored the pole position.

Ricky Stenhouse Jr. scored the pole for the race with a time of 46.253 seconds and a speed of 194.582 mph (313.149 km/h).

=== Qualifying results ===
Pos	No.	Driver	Team	Manufacturer	Time
1	47	Ricky Stenhouse Jr.	JTG Daugherty Racing	Chevrolet	46.253
2	88	Alex Bowman	Hendrick Motorsports	Chevrolet	46.305
3	9	Chase Elliott	Hendrick Motorsports	Chevrolet	46.319
4	48	Jimmie Johnson	Hendrick Motorsports	Chevrolet	46.419
5	11	Denny Hamlin	Joe Gibbs Racing	Toyota	46.528
6	18	Kyle Busch	Joe Gibbs Racing	Toyota	46.662
7	10	Aric Almirola	Stewart-Haas Racing	Ford	46.732
8	24	William Byron	Hendrick Motorsports	Chevrolet	46.767
9	95	Christopher Bell (R)	Leavine Family Racing	Toyota	46.818
10	20	Erik Jones	Joe Gibbs Racing	Toyota	46.859
11	22	Joey Logano	Team Penske	Ford	46.867
12	4	Kevin Harvick	Stewart-Haas Racing	Ford	46.869
13	14	Clint Bowyer	Stewart-Haas Racing	Ford	46.906
14	41	Cole Custer (R)	Stewart-Haas Racing	Ford	46.921
15	6	Ryan Newman	Roush Fenway Racing	Ford	46.950
16	21	Matt DiBenedetto	Wood Brothers Racing	Ford	46.952
17	37	Ryan Preece	JTG Daugherty Racing	Chevrolet	46.969
18	8	Tyler Reddick (R)	Richard Childress Racing	Chevrolet	46.983
19	17	Chris Buescher	Roush Fenway Racing	Ford	46.984
20	42	Kyle Larson	Chip Ganassi Racing	Chevrolet	46.987
21	19	Martin Truex Jr.	Joe Gibbs Racing	Toyota	46.994
22	1	Kurt Busch	Chip Ganassi Racing	Chevrolet	47.052
23	2	Brad Keselowski	Team Penske	Ford	47.054
24	34	Michael McDowell	Front Row Motorsports	Ford	47.070
25	38	John Hunter Nemechek (R)	Front Row Motorsports	Ford	47.076
26	36	David Ragan	Rick Ware Racing	Ford	47.151
27	12	Ryan Blaney	Team Penske	Ford	47.205
28	77	Ross Chastain (i)	Spire Motorsports	Chevrolet	47.262
29	3	Austin Dillon	Richard Childress Racing	Chevrolet	47.273
30	13	Ty Dillon	Germain Racing	Chevrolet	47.353
31	16	Justin Haley (i)	Kaulig Racing	Chevrolet	47.364
32	43	Bubba Wallace	Richard Petty Motorsports	Chevrolet	47.491
33	62	Brendan Gaughan (i)	Beard Motorsports	Chevrolet	47.633
34	27	Reed Sorenson	Premium Motorsports	Chevrolet	48.037
35	66	Timmy Hill (i)	MBM Motorsports	Ford	48.225
36	96	Daniel Suárez	Gaunt Brothers Racing	Toyota	48.523
37	32	Corey LaJoie	Go Fas Racing	Ford	48.605
38	00	Quin Houff (R)	StarCom Racing	Chevrolet	48.943
39	54	J. J. Yeley (i)	Rick Ware Racing	Ford	49.102
40	15	Brennan Poole (R)	Premium Motorsports	Chevrolet	49.510
41	49	Chad Finchum (i)	MBM Motorsports	Toyota	49.515
42	51	Joey Gase (i)	Petty Ware Racing	Chevrolet	50.068
43	52	B. J. McLeod (i)	Rick Ware Racing	Ford	0.000
Official qualifying results

== Bluegreen Vacations Duel ==
The Bluegreen Vacations Duels are a pair of NASCAR Cup Series races held in conjunction with the Daytona 500 annually in February at Daytona International Speedway. They consist of two races 60 laps and 150 miles (240 km) in length, which serve as heat races that set the lineup for the Daytona 500. The first race sets the lineup for cars that qualified in odd-numbered positions on pole qualifying day, while the second race sets the lineup for cars that qualified in even-numbered positions. The Duels set the lineup for positions 3–38, while positions 39 and 40 are filled by the two "Open" (teams without a charter) cars that set the fastest times in qualifying, but did not lock in a spot in the Duels.

For championship purposes, each Duel is a full Championship Stage, except there is no playoff point awarded. The top ten drivers receive championship points.

=== Duel 1 ===
==== Duel 1 results ====
Pos	Grid	No	Driver	Team	Manufacturer	Laps	Points
1	6	22	Joey Logano	Team Penske	Ford	60	10
2	4	10	Aric Almirola	Stewart-Haas Racing	Ford	60	9
3	8	6	Ryan Newman	Roush Fenway Racing	Ford	60	8
4	12	2	Brad Keselowski	Team Penske	Ford	60	7
5	17	43	Bubba Wallace	Richard Petty Motorsports	Chevrolet	60	6
6	15	3	Austin Dillon	Richard Childress Racing	Chevrolet	60	5
7	11	19	Martin Truex Jr.	Joe Gibbs Racing	Toyota	60	4
8	1	47	Ricky Stenhouse Jr.	JTG Daugherty Racing	Chevrolet	60	3
9	5	95	Christopher Bell (R)	Leavine Family Racing	Toyota	60	2
10	10	17	Chris Buescher	Roush Fenway Racing	Ford	60	1
11	3	11	Denny Hamlin	Joe Gibbs Racing	Toyota	60	0
12	13	38	John Hunter Nemechek (R)	Front Row Motorsports	Ford	60	0
13	2	9	Chase Elliott	Hendrick Motorsports	Chevrolet	60	0
14	14	12	Ryan Blaney	Team Penske	Ford	60	0
15	7	14	Clint Bowyer	Stewart-Haas Racing	Ford	60	0
16	9	37	Ryan Preece	JTG Daugherty Racing	Chevrolet	60	0
17	16	16	Justin Haley (i)	Kaulig Racing	Chevrolet	60	0
18	18	27	Reed Sorenson	Premium Motorsports	Chevrolet	59	0
19	20	00	Quin Houff (R)	StarCom Racing	Chevrolet	58	0
20	21	49	Chad Finchum (i)	MBM Motorsports	Toyota	57	0
21	22	51	Joey Gase (i)	Petty Ware Racing	Chevrolet	57	0
22	19	96	Daniel Suárez	Gaunt Brothers Racing	Toyota	28	0
Official race results

=== Duel 2 ===
==== Duel 2 results ====
Pos	Grid	No	Driver	Team	Manufacturer	Laps	Points
1	4	24	William Byron	Hendrick Motorsports	Chevrolet	60	10
2	2	48	Jimmie Johnson	Hendrick Motorsports	Chevrolet	60	9
3	10	42	Kyle Larson	Chip Ganassi Racing	Chevrolet	60	8
4	6	4	Kevin Harvick	Stewart-Haas Racing	Ford	60	7
5	7	41	Cole Custer (R)	Stewart-Haas Racing	Ford	60	6
6	5	20	Erik Jones	Joe Gibbs Racing	Toyota	60	5
7	8	21	Matt DiBenedetto	Wood Brothers Racing	Ford	60	4
8	11	1	Kurt Busch	Chip Ganassi Racing	Chevrolet	60	3
9	14	77	Ross Chastain (i)	Spire Motorsports	Chevrolet	60	0
10	9	8	Tyler Reddick (R)	Richard Childress Racing	Chevrolet	60	1
11	15	13	Ty Dillon	Germain Racing	Chevrolet	60	0
12	12	34	Michael McDowell	Front Row Motorsports	Ford	60	0
13	3	18	Kyle Busch	Joe Gibbs Racing	Toyota	60	0
14	13	36	David Ragan	Rick Ware Racing	Ford	60	0
15	1	88	Alex Bowman	Hendrick Motorsports	Chevrolet	60	0
16	17	66	Timmy Hill (i)	MBM Motorsports	Ford	60	0
17	16	62	Brendan Gaughan (i)	Beard Motorsports	Chevrolet	60	0
18	20	15	Brennan Poole (R)	Premium Motorsports	Chevrolet	59	0
19	18	32	Corey LaJoie	Go Fas Racing	Ford	59	0
20	21	52	B. J. McLeod (i)	Rick Ware Racing	Ford	58	0
21	19	54	J. J. Yeley (i)	Rick Ware Racing	Ford	41	0
Official race results

=== Starting lineup ===
Pos	No	Driver	Team	Manufacturer	Notes
1	47	Ricky Stenhouse Jr.	JTG Daugherty Racing	Chevrolet	Fastest in pole qualifying
2	88	Alex Bowman	Hendrick Motorsports	Chevrolet	Second in pole qualifying
3	22	Joey Logano	Team Penske	Ford	Duel 1 Winner
4	24	William Byron	Hendrick Motorsports	Chevrolet	Duel 2 Winner
5	10	Aric Almirola	Stewart-Haas Racing	Ford	Second in Duel 1
6	48	Jimmie Johnson	Hendrick Motorsports	Chevrolet	Second in Duel 2
7	6	Ryan Newman	Roush Fenway Racing	Ford	Third in Duel 1
8	42	Kyle Larson	Chip Ganassi Racing	Chevrolet	Third in Duel 2
9	2	Brad Keselowski	Team Penske	Ford	Fourth in Duel 1
10	4	Kevin Harvick	Stewart-Haas Racing	Ford	Fourth in Duel 2
11	43	Bubba Wallace	Richard Petty Motorsports	Chevrolet	Fifth in Duel 1
12	41	Cole Custer (R)	Stewart-Haas Racing	Ford	Fifth in Duel 2
13	3	Austin Dillon	Richard Childress Racing	Chevrolet	Sixth in Duel 1
14	20	Erik Jones	Joe Gibbs Racing	Toyota	Sixth in Duel 2
15	19	Martin Truex Jr.	Joe Gibbs Racing	Toyota	Seventh in Duel 1
16	21	Matt DiBenedetto	Wood Brothers Racing	Ford	Seventh in Duel 2
17	95	Christopher Bell (R)	Leavine Family Racing	Toyota	Ninth in Duel 1
18	1	Kurt Busch	Chip Ganassi Racing	Chevrolet	Eighth in Duel 2
19	17	Chris Buescher	Roush Fenway Racing	Ford	Tenth in Duel 1
20	77	Ross Chastain (i)	Spire Motorsports	Chevrolet	Ninth in Duel 2
21	11	Denny Hamlin	Joe Gibbs Racing	Toyota	Eleventh in Duel 1
22	8	Tyler Reddick (R)	Richard Childress Racing	Chevrolet	Tenth in Duel 2
23	38	John Hunter Nemechek (R)	Front Row Motorsports	Ford	Twelfth in Duel 1
24	13	Ty Dillon	Germain Racing	Chevrolet	Eleventh in Duel 2
25	9	Chase Elliott	Hendrick Motorsports	Chevrolet	Thirteenth in Duel 1
26	34	Michael McDowell	Front Row Motorsports	Ford	Twelfth in Duel 2
27	12	Ryan Blaney	Team Penske	Ford	Fourteenth in Duel 1
28	18	Kyle Busch	Joe Gibbs Racing	Toyota	Thirteenth in Duel 2
29	14	Clint Bowyer	Stewart-Haas Racing	Ford	Fifteenth in Duel 1
30	36	David Ragan	Rick Ware Racing	Ford	Fourteenth in Duel 2
31	37	Ryan Preece	JTG Daugherty Racing	Chevrolet	Sixteenth in Duel 1
32	66	Timmy Hill (i)	MBM Motorsports	Ford	Sixteenth in Duel 2
33	16	Justin Haley (i)	Kaulig Racing	Chevrolet	Seventeenth in Duel 1
34	15	Brennan Poole (R)	Premium Motorsports	Chevrolet	Eighteenth in Duel 2
35	00	Quin Houff (R)	StarCom Racing	Chevrolet	Nineteenth in Duel 1
36	32	Corey LaJoie	Go Fas Racing	Ford	Nineteenth in Duel 2
37	51	Joey Gase (i)	Petty Ware Racing	Chevrolet	Twenty-First in Duel 1
38	52	B. J. McLeod (i)	Rick Ware Racing	Ford	Twentieth in Duel 2
39	62	Brendan Gaughan (i)	Beard Motorsports	Chevrolet	Qualifying speed
40	27	Reed Sorenson	Premium Motorsports	Chevrolet	Qualifying speed
Did not qualify
41	49	Chad Finchum (i)	MBM Motorsports	Toyota	
42	96	Daniel Suárez	Gaunt Brothers Racing	Toyota	
43	54	J. J. Yeley (i)	Rick Ware Racing	Ford	
Official starting lineup

== Practice (post–Duels) ==
=== Third practice (February 14) ===
William Byron was the fastest in the third practice session with a time of 43.991 seconds and a speed of 204.587 mph (329.251 km/h).

Pos	No.	Driver	Team	Manufacturer	Time	Speed
1	24	William Byron	Hendrick Motorsports	Chevrolet	43.991	204.587
2	37	Ryan Preece	JTG Daugherty Racing	Chevrolet	44.097	204.096
3	9	Chase Elliott	Hendrick Motorsports	Chevrolet	44.146	203.869
Official third practice results

=== Final practice (February 15) ===
Joey Logano was the fastest in the final practice session with a time of 44.884 seconds and a speed of 200.517 mph (322.701 km/h).

Pos	No.	Driver	Team	Manufacturer	Time	Speed
1	22	Joey Logano	Team Penske	Ford	44.884	200.517
2	4	Kevin Harvick	Stewart-Haas Racing	Ford	44.885	200.512
3	2	Brad Keselowski	Team Penske	Ford	44.888	200.499
Official final practice results

== Race ==
=== Stages 1 and 2 ===
The race was meant to start at 2:30 PM Eastern. But after U. S. President Donald Trump did a couple pace laps in the Motorcade, rain began to fall. Cars were brought down pit road as a result of the rain before the race began and the red flag was shown. The race was red flagged for just over an hour before it was lifted and the race began. Pole sitter Ricky Stenhouse Jr. led the first lap of the race. Cars soon quickly began to form a single file line on the high lane where they would be for most of the race until lap 20. On lap 20, the first caution flew for rain once again. This time, the rain continued throughout the day and into the evening. The race would be delayed to the following day for a 4 PM start time. The next day, the track was dried and the cars got back out on track. Cars pitted for fresh tires and fuel. Brad Keselowski was the new leader and he led the field to the restart on lap 26. On lap 29, Aric Almirola took the lead. Keselowski would take it back on lap 31. On lap 39, Ryan Newman took the lead. Almirola would take the lead the next lap where he and Newman were side by side for two laps before Almirola got in front of Newman. On lap 44, Chase Elliott took the lead. On lap 59, the second caution flew and the first for incident when William Byron got turned by Ricky Stenhouse Jr. down the backstretch and ended up hitting the inside wall head on affectively ending his day. The race would restart on lap 64 with 2 laps to go in the stage. Chase Elliott would hold off the pack and win stage 1. Denny Hamlin was the new leader and he would lead the field to the restart for stage 2 on lap 72. Soon, most of the pack would once again run single file on the top line. On lap 90, the fourth caution would fly when rookie Quin Houff went to go up in front of Aric Almirola down the backstretch but would get turned across Almirola's nose and hit the outside wall while also collecting B. J. McLeod. Both Houff and McLeod would retire from the race. Denny Hamlin won the race off of pit road and he led the field to the restart on lap 96. The race would stay green for the rest of the stage and Hamlin would hold off the pack and win stage 2.

=== Final stage ===
Denny Hamlin won the race off of pit road with Chase Elliott in 2nd but Elliott was penalized for carrying equipment out of his pit box as his gas can got stuck and came off out of his box where Martin Truex Jr. hit it and this sent Elliott to the back. Hamlin led the field to the restart on lap 136. On the restart, Ryan Blaney took the lead. On lap 137, Ricky Stenhouse Jr. took the lead. Blaney would take it back the next lap. Stenhouse attempted to take the lead on lap 140 but failed to get in front of Blaney. On lap 141, Kyle Busch took the lead. This was Busch's 16th attempt to win the Daytona 500. On lap 149, Brad Keselowski took the lead. With 45 laps to go, Kyle Busch attempted to take the lead but couldn't get in front of Keselowski. Blaney attempted with 43 to go but couldn't get in front of Keselowski. With 37 to go, Joey Logano took the lead. With 35 to go, Aric Almirola attempted to take the lead but couldn't get in front of Logano. With 31 to go, drivers began to make green flag pitstops. Logano pitted and handed the lead to Jimmie Johnson, whose in his final full-time season. With 28 to go, Alex Bowman took the lead from his Hendrick Motorsports teammate. At the same time, Ricky Stenhouse spun off of turn 4 after he slowed to pit but got reared by Erik Jones. Stenhouse's hood would come loose during the spin but no caution threw as he was out of harms way. Bowman pitted with 26 to go and after everything cycled through, Kyle Busch was the new leader. With 20 to go, Brad Keselowski took the lead. Unfortunately for Kyle Busch, his chances of winning were over as his engine began to expire as smoke began to pour out of the exhaust which slowed him down but continued for a few more laps. With 17 to go, Ryan Newman took the lead. At the same time, the first big wreck would occur down the backstretch and bringing out the 6th caution of the race. It started when Aric Almirola got a big push from Joey Logano and went to bump Brad Keselowski. Almirola hit Keselowski too hard and ended up turning Keselowski in front of the pack and causing a chain reaction wreck that took out 19 cars. The cars involved were Brad Keselowski, Kurt Busch, Jimmie Johnson, Bubba Wallace, Aric Almirola, Martin Truex Jr., Ryan Blaney, Austin Dillon, Justin Haley, Alex Bowman, Ross Chastain, David Ragan, John Hunter Nemechek, Tyler Reddick, Chris Buescher, Matt DiBenedetto, Brendan Gaughan, Joey Logano, and Ty Dillon. Only Keselowski, Johnson, Busch, and Truex would retire from the race as the red flag flew for the wreck that lasted for just over 10 minutes. Kyle Busch retired after the red flag was lifted due to engine trouble. The race restarted with 10 laps to go. With 8 to go, the 7th caution flew when Reed Sorenson and Timmy Hill crashed off of turn 2. The race would restart with 4 laps to go. With 3 laps to go, Denny Hamlin took the lead from Ryan Newman. With 2 to go, the 8th caution flew for the 2nd big wreck in turn 1. Ross Chastain got a monster run and slingshotted past Newman and attempted to pass Ryan Preece but Preece went to block Chastain and made contact with Chastain causing Chastain to go sideways. Chastain's car overcorrected and hit the outside wall head on right in front of the pack and took out more cars with him. The wreck collected a total of 9 cars. The cars involved were Joey Logano, Ross Chastain, Chase Elliott, Ryan Preece, Tyler Reddick, Ty Dillon, Aric Almirola, Christopher Bell, and Michael McDowell. Dillon, Preece, Reddick, Logano, and Chastain all retired from the race as the red flag was shown once again for the wreck that lasted for 10 minutes. The wreck also set up overtime. But on the restart, the 9th and final caution would fly when Justin Haley got loose on the restart and ended up hitting both Clint Bowyer and Michael McDowell sending them spinning setting up a second attempt of overtime.

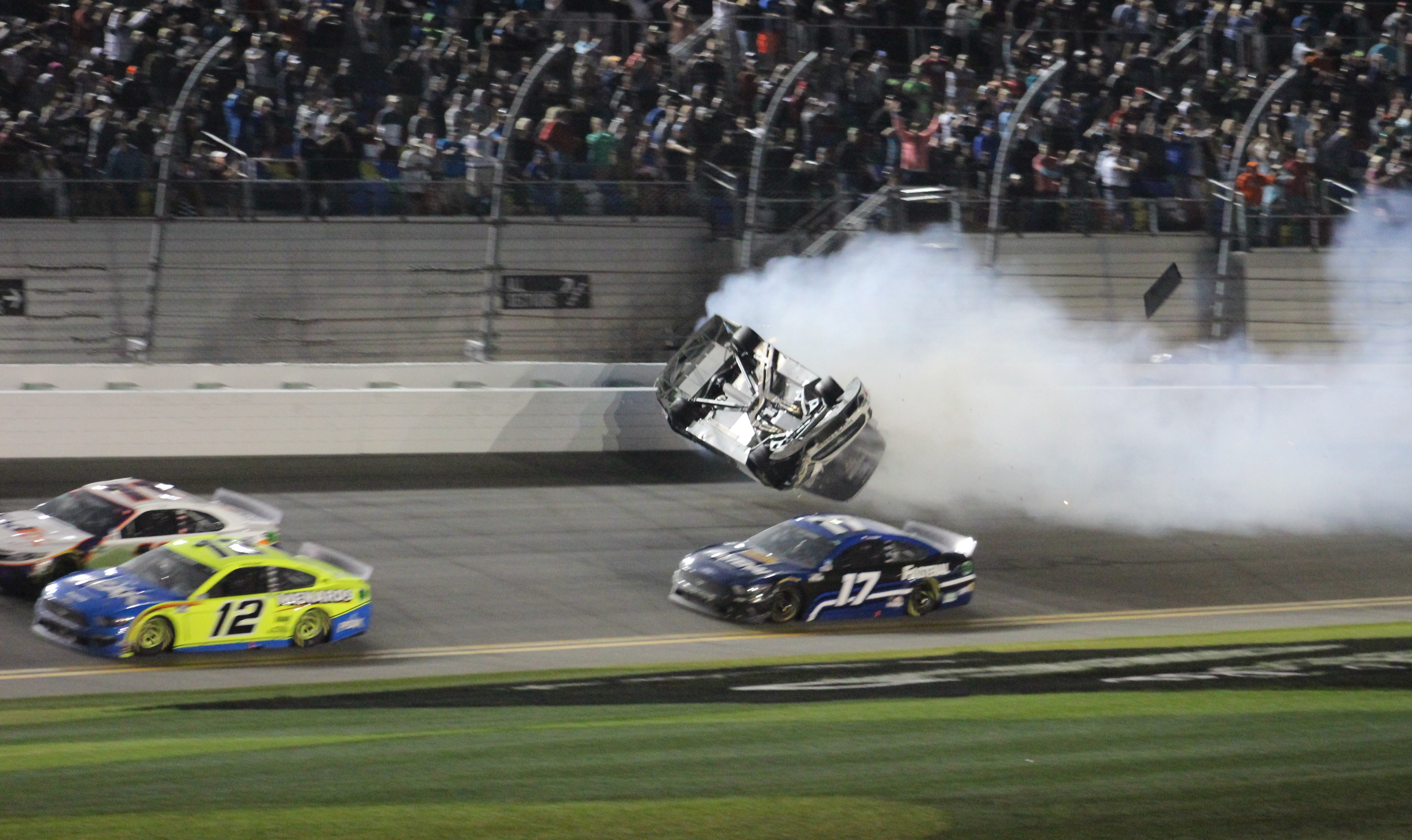
Ryan Newman crashed on the final lap as Denny Hamlin (#11) and Ryan Blaney (#12) raced to the finish line

Hamlin took the lead on the restart with a big push by Ryan Blaney that sent him far ahead from the pack. Hamlin was able to hold off an attempt from Ryan Newman to keep his lead as they took the white flag. On the last lap, Chase Elliott got turned by Justin Haley coming out of the tri-oval but no caution was flown. Down the backstretch, Newman took the lead with a push from Blaney and Blaney got to second. Blaney still had a chance to win as he got a run on Newman through 3 and 4 with Hamlin pushing him. Coming to the checkered off of turn 4, Blaney peaked to Newman's outside but Newman blocked. Blaney tried to slingshot to the inside but Newman blocked also. Blaney went to push Newman to the line and it looked like Newman was gonna hold off and make a surprising win. But Blaney hooked Newman in the right rear causing Newman to spin. Newman spun and hit the outside wall with the left front and driver's side at nearly full speed which sent his car to blowover upside down. Newman skidded on his roof upside down before he was hit in the driver's window by Corey LaJoie which sent Newman's car about 15 feet into the air and barrel rolling through the air before it landed on its roof just before crossing the finish line. His car skidding on its roof past the finish line before it stopped at the exit of pit road on its roof. For the finish, the contact with Newman was able to slow down Blaney's momentum and Hamlin beat Blaney to the line by 0.014 seconds, the second closest finish in Daytona 500 history.

=== Post-race ===
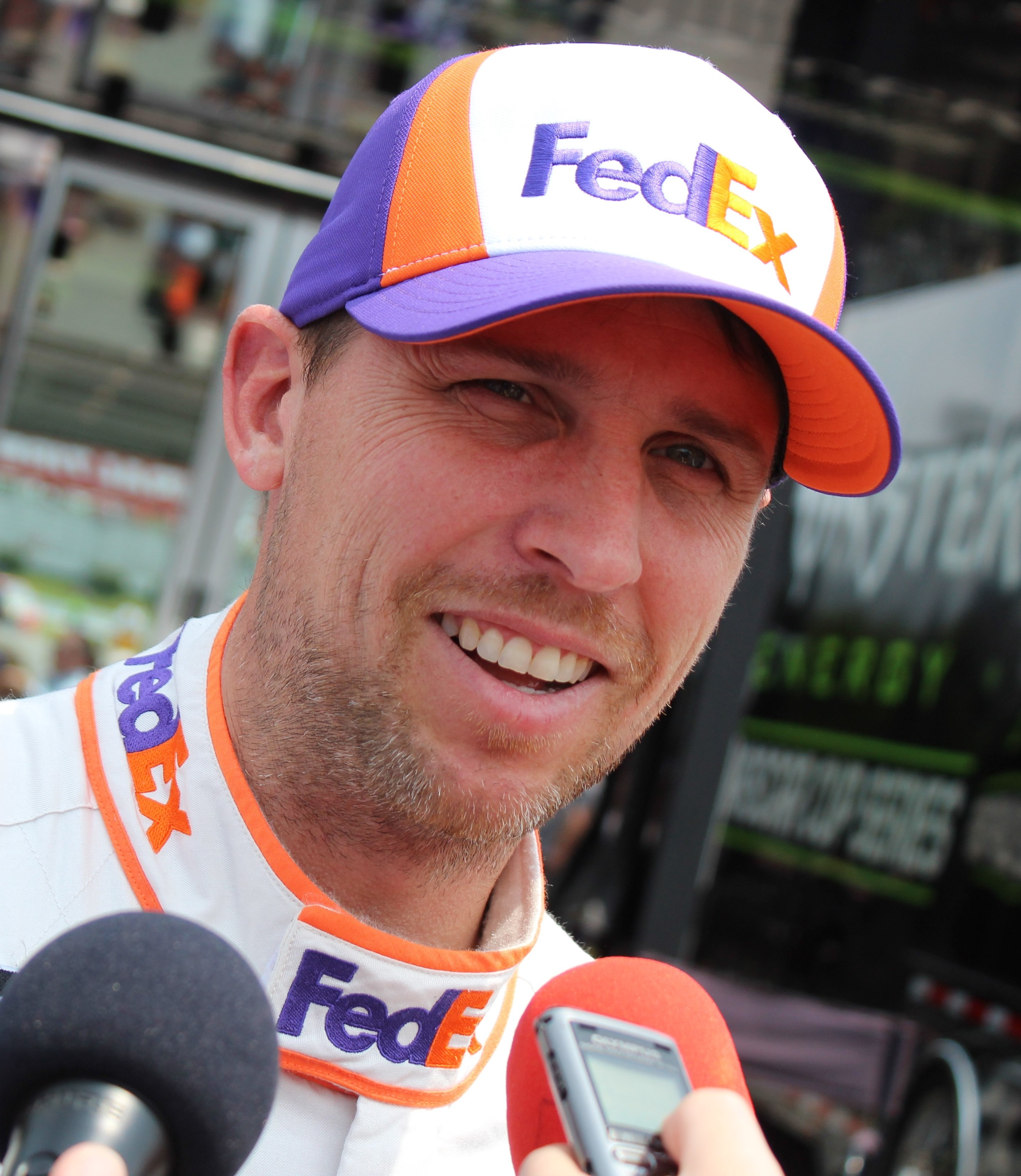
Denny Hamlin won the race.

LaJoie's front end was completely destroyed and caught on fire but LaJoie walked out with no injuries. But Newman was unconscious as he was failing to respond to the crew's questions if he was okay. Rescue crews were there quickly to assist Newman. It took nearly 15 minutes for crews to extract Newman from his car as they had to turn his car back right side up and cut the roof off to further assist him. He was rushed to Halifax Medical Center to be further treated. Meanwhile, in the immediate post-race, Hamlin and his crew, unaware of the severity of Newman's crash, began celebrating his win and was subsequently booed heavily by the crowd upon exiting his car, both on the infield grass and again in victory lane. Joe Gibbs issued an apology for the team's celebration, with Hamlin saying he was first aware of the accident's severity when NASCAR canceled the recent tradition of interviewing the winner on the front-stretch prior to the car being driven to victory lane. This was Hamlin's third Daytona 500 victory and his second in a row becoming the first to go back-to-back since Sterling Marlin did it in 1994 and 1995. Newman had suffered serious but non life-threatening injuries as he had suffered a brain bruise and was released two days later. He missed the next three races where he was replaced by Ross Chastain and was able to return in NASCAR's first race since the COVID-19 pandemic began. Ryan Blaney, Chris Buescher, David Ragan, and Kevin Harvick rounded out the top 5 while Clint Bowyer, Brendan Gaughan, Corey LaJoie, Ryan Newman, and Kyle Larson rounded out the top 10.

=== Stage Results ===
Stage One Laps: 65

Pos	No	Driver	Team	Manufacturer	Points
1	9	Chase Elliott	Hendrick Motorsports	Chevrolet	10
2	88	Alex Bowman	Hendrick Motorsports	Chevrolet	9
3	10	Aric Almirola	Stewart-Haas Racing	Ford	8
4	22	Joey Logano	Team Penske	Ford	7
5	48	Jimmie Johnson	Hendrick Motorsports	Chevrolet	6
6	12	Ryan Blaney	Team Penske	Ford	5
7	47	Ricky Stenhouse Jr.	JTG Daugherty Racing	Chevrolet	4
8	21	Matt DiBenedetto	Wood Brothers Racing	Ford	3
9	17	Chris Buescher	Roush Fenway Racing	Ford	2
10	13	Ty Dillon	Germain Racing	Chevrolet	1
Official stage one results

Stage Two Laps: 65

Pos	No	Driver	Team	Manufacturer	Points
1	11	Denny Hamlin	Joe Gibbs Racing	Toyota	10
2	18	Kyle Busch	Joe Gibbs Racing	Toyota	9
3	47	Ricky Stenhouse Jr.	JTG Daughtery Racing	Chevrolet	8
4	19	Martin Truex Jr.	Joe Gibbs Racing	Toyota	7
5	77	Ross Chastain (i)	Spire Motorsports	Chevrolet	0
6	48	Jimmie Johnson	Hendrick Motorsports	Chevrolet	5
7	9	Chase Elliott	Hendrick Motorsports	Chevrolet	4
8	12	Ryan Blaney	Team Penske	Ford	3
9	22	Joey Logano	Team Penske	Ford	2
10	17	Chris Buescher	Roush Fenway Racing	Ford	1
Official stage two results

=== Final Stage Results ===
Stage Three Laps: 70

Hamlin (11) beat Blaney by 0.014 seconds, the second closest Daytona 500 in history.

Pos	Grid	No	Driver	Team	Manufacturer	Laps	Points
1	21	11	Denny Hamlin	Joe Gibbs Racing	Toyota	209	50
2	27	12	Ryan Blaney	Team Penske	Ford	209	43
3	19	17	Chris Buescher	Roush Fenway Racing	Ford	209	37
4	30	36	David Ragan	Rick Ware Racing	Ford	209	33
5	10	4	Kevin Harvick	Stewart-Haas Racing	Ford	209	32
6	29	14	Clint Bowyer	Stewart-Haas Racing	Ford	209	31
7	39	62	Brendan Gaughan (i)	Beard Motorsports	Chevrolet	209	0
8	38	32	Corey LaJoie	Go Fas Racing	Ford	209	29
9	7	6	Ryan Newman	Roush Fenway Racing	Ford	209	28
10	8	42	Kyle Larson	Chip Ganassi Racing	Chevrolet	209	27
11	23	38	John Hunter Nemechek (R)	Front Row Motorsports	Ford	209	26
12	13	3	Austin Dillon	Richard Childress Racing	Chevrolet	209	25
13	33	16	Justin Haley (i)	Kaulig Racing	Chevrolet	209	0
14	26	34	Michael McDowell	Front Row Motorsports	Ford	209	23
15	11	43	Bubba Wallace	Richard Petty Motorsports	Chevrolet	209	22
16	34	15	Brennan Poole (R)	Premium Motorsports	Chevrolet	209	21
17	25	9	Chase Elliott	Hendrick Motorsports	Chevrolet	209	34
18	14	20	Erik Jones	Joe Gibbs Racing	Toyota	208	19
19	16	21	Matt DiBenedetto	Wood Brothers Racing	Ford	207	21
20	1	47	Ricky Stenhouse Jr.	JTG Daugherty Racing	Chevrolet	206	29
21	17	95	Christopher Bell (R)	Leavine Family Racing	Toyota	205	16
22	5	10	Aric Almirola	Stewart-Haas Racing	Ford	205	23
23	37	51	Joey Gase (i)	Petty Ware Racing	Chevrolet	203	0
24	2	88	Alex Bowman	Hendrick Motorsports	Chevrolet	203	22
25	20	77	Ross Chastain (i)	Spire Motorsports	Chevrolet	201	0
26	3	22	Joey Logano	Team Penske	Ford	200	20
27	32	66	Timmy Hill (i)	MBM Motorsports	Ford	200	0
28	22	8	Tyler Reddick (R)	Richard Childress Racing	Chevrolet	199	9
29	31	37	Ryan Preece	JTG Daugherty Racing	Chevrolet	198	8
30	24	13	Ty Dillon	Germain Racing	Chevrolet	198	8
31	40	27	Reed Sorenson	Premium Motorsports	Chevrolet	192	6
32	15	19	Martin Truex Jr.	Joe Gibbs Racing	Toyota	186	12
33	18	1	Kurt Busch	Chip Ganassi Racing	Chevrolet	184	4
34	28	18	Kyle Busch	Joe Gibbs Racing	Toyota	184	12
35	6	48	Jimmie Johnson	Hendrick Motorsports	Chevrolet	184	13
36	9	2	Brad Keselowski	Team Penske	Ford	183	1
37	12	41	Cole Custer (R)	Stewart-Haas Racing	Ford	174	1
38	38	52	B. J. McLeod (i)	Rick Ware Racing	Ford	105	0
39	35	00	Quin Houff (R)	StarCom Racing	Chevrolet	89	1
40	4	24	William Byron	Hendrick Motorsports	Chevrolet	58	1
Official race results

=== Race statistics ===
- Lead changes: 23 among 13 different drivers
- Cautions/Laps: 9 for 39
- Red flags: 3 (1 for weather, 2 for accidents)
- Time of race: 3 hours, 42 minutes and 10 seconds
- Margin of Victory: 0.014 seconds
- Average speed: 141.11 miles per hour (227.09 km/h)

== Media ==
=== Television ===
Since 2001—with the exception of 2002, 2004 and 2006—the Daytona 500 has been carried by Fox in the United States. The booth crew consists of longtime NASCAR lap-by-lap announcer Mike Joy and three–time Daytona 500 champion Jeff Gordon. Pit road is manned by Jamie Little, Regan Smith, Vince Welch, and Matt Yocum. 1992 and 1998 Daytona 500 winning crew chief Larry McReynolds and 2010 Daytona 500 winning driver Jamie McMurray provided insight from the Fox Sports studio in Charlotte.

Fox Television
Booth announcers	Pit reporters	In-race analysts
Lap-by-lap: Mike Joy; Color-commentator: Jeff Gordon	Jamie Little; Regan Smith; Vince Welch; Matt Yocum	Larry McReynolds; Jamie McMurray

=== Radio ===
The race was broadcast on radio by the Motor Racing Network—who has covered the Daytona 500 since 1970—and simulcast on Sirius XM NASCAR Radio. The booth crew consists of Alex Hayden, Jeff Striegle, and 1989 Cup Series champion Rusty Wallace. Longtime turn announcer Dave Moody is the lead turn announcer, calling the race from atop the Sunoco tower outside the exit of turn 2 when the field races through turns 1 and 2. Mike Bagley works the backstretch for the race from a spotter's stand on the inside of the track & Kyle Rickey calls the race when the field races through turns 3 and 4 from the Sunoco tower outside the exit of turn 4. On pit road, MRN is manned by lead pit reporter and NASCAR Hall of Fame Executive Director Winston Kelley. He will be joined on pit road by Steve Post, Kim Coon, and Dillon Welch.

MRN Radio
Booth announcers	Turn announcers	Pit reporters
Lead announcer: Alex Hayden; Announcer: Jeff Striegle; Announcer: Rusty Wallace	Turns 1 & 2: Dave Moody; Backstretch: Mike Bagley; Turns 3 & 4: Kyle Rickey	Winston Kelley; Steve Post; Dillon Welch; Kim Coon

== Standings after the race ==
Drivers' Championship standings

Pos	Driver	Points
1	Denny Hamlin	50
2	Ryan Blaney	43 (–7)
3	Kevin Harvick	39 (–11)
4	Chris Buescher	38 (–12)
5	Ryan Newman	36 (–14)
6	Kyle Larson	35 (–15)
7	Chase Elliott	34 (–16)
8	David Ragan	33 (–17)
9	Ricky Stenhouse Jr.	32 (–18)
10	Aric Almirola	32 (–18)
11	Clint Bowyer	31 (–19)
12	Austin Dillon	30 (–20)
13	Joey Logano	30 (–20)
14	Corey LaJoie	29 (–21)
15	Bubba Wallace	28 (–22)
16	John Hunter Nemechek	26 (–24)
Official driver's standings

Manufacturers' Championship standings

Pos	Manufacturer	Points
1	Toyota	40
2	Ford	35 (–5)
3	Chevrolet	30 (–10)

- Note: Only the first 16 positions are included for the driver standings.

Previous race: 2019 Ford EcoBoost 400	NASCAR Cup Series; 2020 season	Next race: 2020 Pennzoil 400
