= DuQuoin State Fair =

Annual agricultural fair in Illinois, US

Du Quoin State Fair
- Genre: State fair
- Frequency: Annually
- Inaugurated: 1923
- Most recent: 22 August–1 September 2025
- Next event: 28 August–7 September 2026

The DuQuoin State Fair is an annual festival, centering on the themes of agriculture and country music, hosted by the U.S. state of Illinois on an approximately 1,600 acres (650 ha) fairground site adjacent to the southern Illinois town of Du Quoin. The state fair has been celebrated almost every year since 1923. In the 1920s, the Fair opened on Labor Day; currently, the fair is held annually over an 11-day period concluding on Labor Day of each year. In 2025, the Fair notched 282,202 fairgoers, described as a record attendance for the event.

== Founding ==
The DuQuoin Fair was organized in 1923 by William R. "W.R." Hayes and a consortium of Du Quoin developers, but after several years Hayes would buy out the other investors. It is believed that Hayes was inspired after attending the World's Fair in St. Louis, Missouri. The land, purchased by William R. Hayes, was originally used for strip mining. The first fair received funding from approximately 13 other businesses within the town. The original fair took place on 30-acre land. William and the developers promoted the private-sector enterprise as a short-duration race meeting specializing in harness racing, which William R. Hayes was known to be a fan of.

Starting with a half-mile track, the developers eventually built a mile-long DuQuoin State Fairgrounds Racetrack on the fairgrounds.

== The Racetrack ==
The racetrack began hosting the Hambletonian trotting event in 1957, following its departure from several fairs in New York, and would continue to host until 1980. After the Hambletonian moved to a new location, the World Trotting Derby would then be hosted at the fair from 1981-2009.

With the departure of the Hambletonian, the DuQuoin Fair faced economic challenges and was taken over from the private sector in 1986 by the state of Illinois. Since that time, it has been operated by the Illinois Department of Agriculture as a state fair with a distinctive Southern Illinois heritage. Although the host town of the fair is spelled "Du Quoin", with a space, the Department of Agriculture refers to the fair as the "DuQuoin State Fair", with the space omitted.

The racetrack is used today for ARCA and USAC motor sporting events. There is still a half-mile track on the grounds, which host a variety of events: Tractor pulls, Motocross, ATV racing, and Demolition derby events. The mile long track is the DuQuoin State Fairgrounds Racetrack, also called the "Magic Mile." While events on the racetrack do occur during the fair, the tracks host events at other times throughout the year.

== The Performances ==
The DuQuoin State Fair also became known for the concerts and shows that were put on. The first stage show was in 1924, and included acrobats, comedians, and more. And the stage shows became a nightly staple beginning in the late 1920s. Some of the earliest performers include the Rice Brothers Circus, The Dixie High Steppers, wrestlers, and more. The early fairs also had bands and a parade, which is a tradition that has continued. William R. Hayes' son, Don, is the supposed reason for country music's debut at the fair. Many of the performances take place in a building called the Grandstand. Below, split into decades, are lists of notable performers.

=== The 1970s ===
In 1971, Chicago performed. In the year 1972, Charley Pride, Johnny Cash, and June Carter Cash had shows.

=== 1980s ===
The Beach Boys first performed at the fair in 1983, but returned to play in 1986, 1987, and 1988. In 1987, The Pointer Sisters were another noteworthy group that performed at the fair.

=== 1990s ===
In 1991, Nelson & Tyketto performed. In 1996, David Lee Murphy and Soul Asylum performed.

=== 2000s ===
In 2005, Seether and Travis Tritt had notable performances. In 2006, Shooter Jennings, Blue Öyster Cult, The Marshall Tucker Band and Little Big Town put on a show. Gary Allan and Joe Nichols were popular artists that performed in 2007. The Charlie Daniels Band, Halfway to Hazard, Rehab, and Joe Diffie performed in 2009. And, in 2010, Uncle Kracker and Dierks Bentley performed.

=== 2010s ===
In 2013 the following artists performed: Gretchen Wilson, Theory of a Deadman, Montgomery Gentry, and Head East (who performed again in 2015). In 2014 KC and the Sunshine Band performed. In 2016, Jamey Johnson had a show. Chris Janson, Gin Blossoms, and Brothers Osborne performed in 2017. 2018 was a big year for rock as Buckcherry, P.O.D., Lit, and Alien Ant Farm performed. And, in 2019, The All-American Rejects performed.

=== 2020s ===
In 2021, Ron White had an act. Chase Rice, Lainey Wilson, Jordan Davis (singer), and Cole Swindell were acts in 2022. In 2023, Carly Pearce, Dustin Lynch, Flo Rida, Randy Houser (who was supposed to perform the year prior but had a last minute cancellation), and Larry the Cable Guy had shows.

== Agriculture ==
Agriculture is one of the prominent themes of the fair. The early fairs had livestock and horse shows, and the livestock shows have continued to be a staple. For some of the competitions there are youth versions. "Beef cattle, dairy cattle, heavy horses, mules, sheep, swine, dairy goats, and meet goats" are the livestock represented in the current competitions. Swine is now the most popular animal at the livestock shows. The safety and health of the animals are a high priority, with inspections and certifications being necessary. The fair has also hosted rodeo shows, pageants, and cooking competitions. The current fair includes a variety of vendors, many local. Many of the popular vendors sell fried foods, such as corndogs, fries, fried pickles, and more.

== Other events ==
The fair is also the host of several other events throughout the year. Certain racing events occur at other times throughout the year, such as motocross. A firework show for Independence Day is hosted on the grounds. "The Holiday Lights Fair," a drive-through holiday lights show, is set up at the fair during the holiday season; and, a flea market is hosted on the first Sunday of each month. The fair is looking for other future events to host. The website lists a farmers market as a potential idea that is taking vendors. With the next solar eclipse occurring in 2024, the fair is looking to be a "prime viewing" location for the event with hopes that tourists will stay in local hotels and visit local businesses.

== Facts & Statistics ==
- Over 1,000 available trailer spaces
- Grandstand (stage area) capacity: approximately 7,500
  - Original Grandstand seat number: 3,000
- Exhibition Hall Size: 45,000 square ft
- No fair was held between 1942–45 nor 2020; the fair in 2020 was cancelled due to the COVID-19 pandemic
- The fair in 2022 would have been the 100th one if it had not been cancelled in 2020
- In the 1920s, it cost 50 cents to enter the grounds and between 25 and 50 cents to enter the Grandstand
- Fireworks were a source of entertainment at early fairs
- Hayes owned several other business before starting the fair
- The grounds contain restrooms, showers, picnic areas, fishing sites, ski shows and more
- The performance by Cole Swindell had the fourth most attendees at a concert since 2012
- The fair has an estimated "economic impact of $6 million"
- In 2025, a new record for attendance was set: 282,202 attendees
