= 2018 JAG Metals 350 =

21st race of the 2018 NASCAR Camping World Truck Series

Race details
- Race 21 of 23 of the 2018 NASCAR Camping World Truck Series
- Date: November 2, 2018
- Official name: 20th Annual JAG Metals 350
- Location: Fort Worth, Texas, Texas Motor Speedway
- Course: Permanent racing facility
- Course length: 1.5 miles (2.41 km)
- Distance: 147 laps, 220.5 mi (354.86 km)
- Scheduled distance: 147 laps, 220.5 mi (354.86 km)
- Average speed: 119.064 miles per hour (191.615 km/h)

Pole position
| Driver | Johnny Sauter | GMS Racing |
- Time: 28.608

Most laps led
| Driver | Todd Gilliland | Kyle Busch Motorsports |
- Laps: 60

Winner
| No. 24 | Justin Haley | GMS Racing |

Television in the United States
- Network: Fox Sports 1
- Announcers: Vince Welch, Phil Parsons, Michael Waltrip

Radio in the United States
- Radio: Motor Racing Network

The 2018 JAG Metals 350 was the 21st stock car race of the 2018 NASCAR Camping World Truck Series, the second race of the Round of 6, and the 20th iteration of the event. The race was held on Friday, November 2, 2018, in Fort Worth, Texas at Texas Motor Speedway, a 1.5 miles (2.4 km) permanent tri-oval shaped racetrack. The race took the scheduled 147 laps to complete. At race's end, Justin Haley of GMS Racing would complete a last lap pass on Todd Gilliland, who ran out of fuel on the last lap to advance to the Final 4. The win was Haley's third and to date, final NASCAR Camping World Truck Series win and his third and final win of the season. To fill out the podium, Ben Rhodes of ThorSport Racing and Brett Moffitt of Hattori Racing Enterprises would finish second and third, respectively.

== Background ==
The layout of Texas Motor Speedway, the venue where the race as held.

Texas Motor Speedway is a speedway located in the northernmost portion of the U.S. city of Fort Worth, Texas – the portion located in Denton County, Texas. The track measures 1.5 miles (2.4 km) around and is banked 24 degrees in the turns, and is of the oval design, where the front straightaway juts outward slightly. The track layout is similar to Atlanta Motor Speedway and Charlotte Motor Speedway (formerly Lowe's Motor Speedway). The track is owned by Speedway Motorsports, Inc., the same company that owns Atlanta and Charlotte Motor Speedway, as well as the short-track Bristol Motor Speedway.

=== Entry list ===
| # | Driver | Team | Make | Sponsor |
|---|---|---|---|---|
| 0 | Camden Murphy* | Jennifer Jo Cobb Racing | Chevrolet | Ciccarelli Moving & Installation |
| 2 | Sheldon Creed | GMS Racing | Chevrolet | A.M. Ortega, United Rentals |
| 02 | Austin Hill | Young's Motorsports | Chevrolet | Ennis Steel Industries |
| 3 | Jordan Anderson | Jordan Anderson Racing | Chevrolet | Bommarito Automotive Group |
| 4 | Todd Gilliland | Kyle Busch Motorsports | Toyota | JBL, SiriusXM |
| 04 | Cory Roper | Roper Racing | Ford | Preferred Industrial Contractors, Inc. |
| 7 | Reid Wilson | All Out Motorsports | Toyota | TruNorth |
| 8 | Joe Nemechek | NEMCO Motorsports | Chevrolet | Tweaker Energy Shot |
| 9 | Codie Rohrbaugh | CR7 Motorsports | Ford | Grant County Mulch |
| 10 | Jennifer Jo Cobb | Jennifer Jo Cobb Racing | Chevrolet | Driven2Honor.org |
| 12 | Tyler Young | Young's Motorsports | Chevrolet | 4P Energy Services |
| 13 | Myatt Snider | ThorSport Racing | Ford | Century Container |
| 15 | Mike Harmon | Premium Motorsports | Chevrolet | VIP Racing Experience |
| 16 | Brett Moffitt | Hattori Racing Enterprises | Toyota | Aisin |
| 17 | David Gilliland | DGR-Crosley | Toyota | Crosley Brands |
| 18 | Noah Gragson | Kyle Busch Motorsports | Toyota | Safelite Auto Glass |
| 20 | Tanner Thorson | Young's Motorsports | Chevrolet | GoShare |
| 21 | Johnny Sauter | GMS Racing | Chevrolet | ISM Connect |
| 22 | Austin Wayne Self | Niece Motorsports | Chevrolet | Sorghum |
| 24 | Justin Haley | GMS Racing | Chevrolet | Fraternal Order of Eagles |
| 25 | Tyler Dippel | GMS Racing | Chevrolet | America First Action Super PAC |
| 33 | Josh Reaume | Reaume Brothers Racing | Chevrolet | Reaume Brothers Racing |
| 35 | Brennan Poole | NextGen Motorsports | Toyota | Inspectra Thermal Solutions |
| 38 | Ross Chastain | Niece Motorsports | Chevrolet | MG Machinery |
| 41 | Ben Rhodes | ThorSport Racing | Ford | The Carolina Nut Company |
| 45 | Justin Fontaine | Niece Motorsports | Chevrolet | ProMatic Automation |
| 49 | Reed Sorenson | Premium Motorsports | Chevrolet | SobrietyNation.org |
| 51 | Harrison Burton | Kyle Busch Motorsports | Toyota | DEX Imaging |
| 52 | Stewart Friesen | Halmar Friesen Racing | Chevrolet | Halmar "We Build America" |
| 54 | Bo LeMastus | DGR-Crosley | Toyota | Crosley Brands |
| 83 | Bayley Currey | Copp Motorsports | Chevrolet | Hull Supply Company |
| 87 | Timmy Hill | NEMCO Motorsports | Chevrolet | D.A.B. Constructors, Inc. |
| 88 | Matt Crafton | ThorSport Racing | Ford | Menards, Ideal Door |
| 97 | Jesse Little | JJL Motorsports | Ford | SkuttleTight |
| 98 | Grant Enfinger | ThorSport Racing | Ford | Protect the Harvest |
Official entry list

*Withdrew.

== Practice ==
=== First practice ===
The first practice session was held on Thursday, November 1, at 3:05 PM CST, and would last for 50 minutes. Johnny Sauter of GMS Racing would set the fastest time in the session, with a lap of 28.998 and an average speed of 186.220 miles per hour (299.692 km/h).

| Pos. | # | Driver | Team | Make | Time | Speed |
|---|---|---|---|---|---|---|
| 1 | 21 | Johnny Sauter | GMS Racing | Chevrolet | 28.998 | 186.220 |
| 2 | 18 | Noah Gragson | Kyle Busch Motorsports | Toyota | 29.267 | 184.508 |
| 3 | 51 | Harrison Burton | Kyle Busch Motorsports | Toyota | 29.321 | 184.168 |
Full first practice results

=== Second and final practice ===
The second and final practice session, sometimes referred to as Happy Hour, was held on Thursday, November 1, at 5:05 PM CST, and would last for 50 minutes. Brett Moffitt of Hattori Racing Enterprises would set the fastest time in the session, with a lap of 28.754 and an average speed of 187.800 miles per hour (302.235 km/h).

| Pos. | # | Driver | Team | Make | Time | Speed |
|---|---|---|---|---|---|---|
| 1 | 16 | Brett Moffitt | Hattori Racing Enterprises | Toyota | 28.754 | 187.800 |
| 2 | 41 | Ben Rhodes | ThorSport Racing | Ford | 28.836 | 187.266 |
| 3 | 21 | Johnny Sauter | GMS Racing | Chevrolet | 28.908 | 186.800 |
Full Happy Hour practice results

== Qualifying ==
Qualifying was held on Friday, November 2, at 3:10 PM CST. Since Texas Motor Speedway is at least a 1.5 miles (2.4 km) racetrack, the qualifying system was a single car, single lap, two round system where in the first round, everyone would set a time to determine positions 13–32. Then, the fastest 12 qualifiers would move on to the second round to determine positions 1–12.

Johnny Sauter of GMS Racing would win the pole, setting a lap of 28.608 and an average speed of 188.758 miles per hour (303.777 km/h) in the second round.

Two drivers would fail to qualify: Josh Reaume and Reid Wilson.

=== Full qualifying results ===
| Pos. | # | Driver | Team | Make | Time (R1) | Speed (R1) | Time (R2) | Speed (R2) |
|---|---|---|---|---|---|---|---|---|
| 1 | 21 | Johnny Sauter | GMS Racing | Chevrolet | | | 28.608 | 188.758 |
| 2 | 18 | Noah Gragson | Kyle Busch Motorsports | Toyota | | | 28.633 | 188.594 |
| 3 | 52 | Stewart Friesen | Halmar Friesen Racing | Chevrolet | | | 28.699 | 188.160 |
| 4 | 16 | Brett Moffitt | Hattori Racing Enterprises | Toyota | | | 28.738 | 187.905 |
| 5 | 17 | David Gilliland | DGR-Crosley | Toyota | | | 28.760 | 187.761 |
| 6 | 24 | Justin Haley | GMS Racing | Chevrolet | | | 28.940 | 186.593 |
| 7 | 2 | Sheldon Creed | GMS Racing | Chevrolet | | | 28.963 | 186.445 |
| 8 | 51 | Harrison Burton | Kyle Busch Motorsports | Toyota | | | 28.978 | 186.348 |
| 9 | 25 | Tyler Dippel | GMS Racing | Chevrolet | | | 29.197 | 184.951 |
| 10 | 97 | Jesse Little | JJL Motorsports | Ford | | | 29.216 | 184.830 |
| 11 | 87 | Timmy Hill | NEMCO Motorsports | Chevrolet | | | 31.811 | 169.753 |
| 12 | 4 | Todd Gilliland | Kyle Busch Motorsports | Toyota | 28.909 | 186.793 | — | — |
Eliminated in Round 1
| 13 | 98 | Grant Enfinger | ThorSport Racing | Ford | 29.161 | 185.179 | — | — |
| 14 | 88 | Matt Crafton | ThorSport Racing | Ford | 29.187 | 185.014 | — | — |
| 15 | 02 | Austin Hill | Young's Motorsports | Chevrolet | 29.198 | 184.944 | — | — |
| 16 | 41 | Ben Rhodes | ThorSport Racing | Ford | 29.211 | 184.862 | — | — |
| 17 | 13 | Myatt Snider | ThorSport Racing | Ford | 29.219 | 184.811 | — | — |
| 18 | 8 | Joe Nemechek | NEMCO Motorsports | Chevrolet | 29.239 | 184.685 | — | — |
| 19 | 38 | Ross Chastain | Niece Motorsports | Chevrolet | 29.332 | 184.099 | — | — |
| 20 | 54 | Bo LeMastus | DGR-Crosley | Toyota | 29.353 | 183.968 | — | — |
| 21 | 22 | Austin Wayne Self | Niece Motorsports | Chevrolet | 29.402 | 183.661 | — | — |
| 22 | 35 | Brennan Poole | NextGen Motorsports | Toyota | 29.515 | 182.958 | — | — |
| 23 | 04 | Cory Roper | Roper Racing | Ford | 29.530 | 182.865 | — | — |
| 24 | 12 | Tyler Young | Young's Motorsports | Chevrolet | 29.603 | 182.414 | — | — |
| 25 | 83 | Bayley Currey | Copp Motorsports | Chevrolet | 29.809 | 181.153 | — | — |
| 26 | 9 | Codie Rohrbaugh | CR7 Motorsports | Ford | 29.837 | 180.983 | — | — |
| 27 | 49 | Reed Sorenson | Premium Motorsports | Chevrolet | 29.922 | 180.469 | — | — |
Qualified by owner's points
| 28 | 45 | Justin Fontaine | Niece Motorsports | Chevrolet | 30.177 | 178.944 | — | — |
| 29 | 20 | Tanner Thorson | Young's Motorsports | Chevrolet | 30.185 | 178.897 | — | — |
| 30 | 10 | Jennifer Jo Cobb | Jennifer Jo Cobb Racing | Chevrolet | 30.591 | 176.523 | — | — |
| 31 | 15 | Mike Harmon | Premium Motorsports | Chevrolet | 31.876 | 169.406 | — | — |
| 32 | 3 | Jordan Anderson | Jordan Anderson Racing | Chevrolet | 34.152 | 158.117 | — | — |
Failed to qualify or withdrew
| 33 | 33 | Josh Reaume | Reaume Brothers Racing | Chevrolet | 30.302 | 178.206 | — | — |
| 34 | 7 | Reid Wilson | All Out Motorsports | Toyota | 31.071 | 173.796 | — | — |
| WD | 0 | Camden Murphy | Jennifer Jo Cobb Racing | Chevrolet | — | — | — | — |
Official starting lineup

== Race results ==
Stage 1 Laps: 35

| Pos. | # | Driver | Team | Make | Pts |
|---|---|---|---|---|---|
| 1 | 24 | Justin Haley | GMS Racing | Chevrolet | 10 |
| 2 | 2 | Sheldon Creed | GMS Racing | Chevrolet | 9 |
| 3 | 52 | Stewart Friesen | Halmar Friesen Racing | Chevrolet | 8 |
| 4 | 88 | Matt Crafton | ThorSport Racing | Ford | 7 |
| 5 | 16 | Brett Moffitt | Hattori Racing Enterprises | Toyota | 6 |
| 6 | 18 | Noah Gragson | Kyle Busch Motorsports | Toyota | 5 |
| 7 | 98 | Grant Enfinger | ThorSport Racing | Ford | 4 |
| 8 | 41 | Ben Rhodes | ThorSport Racing | Ford | 3 |
| 9 | 38 | Ross Chastain | Niece Motorsports | Chevrolet | 0 |
| 10 | 4 | Todd Gilliland | Kyle Busch Motorsports | Toyota | 1 |

Stage 2 Laps: 35

| Pos. | # | Driver | Team | Make | Pts |
|---|---|---|---|---|---|
| 1 | 13 | Myatt Snider | ThorSport Racing | Ford | 10 |
| 2 | 02 | Austin Hill | Young's Motorsports | Chevrolet | 9 |
| 3 | 24 | Justin Haley | GMS Racing | Chevrolet | 8 |
| 4 | 98 | Grant Enfinger | ThorSport Racing | Ford | 7 |
| 5 | 88 | Matt Crafton | ThorSport Racing | Ford | 6 |
| 6 | 16 | Brett Moffitt | Hattori Racing Enterprises | Toyota | 5 |
| 7 | 25 | Tyler Dippel | GMS Racing | Chevrolet | 4 |
| 8 | 35 | Brennan Poole | NextGen Motorsports | Toyota | 3 |
| 9 | 4 | Todd Gilliland | Kyle Busch Motorsports | Toyota | 2 |
| 10 | 8 | Joe Nemechek | NEMCO Motorsports | Chevrolet | 1 |

Stage 3 Laps: 77

| Fin | St | # | Driver | Team | Make | Laps | Led | Status | Pts |
|---|---|---|---|---|---|---|---|---|---|
| 1 | 6 | 24 | Justin Haley | GMS Racing | Chevrolet | 147 | 33 | running | 58 |
| 2 | 16 | 41 | Ben Rhodes | ThorSport Racing | Ford | 147 | 2 | running | 38 |
| 3 | 4 | 16 | Brett Moffitt | Hattori Racing Enterprises | Toyota | 147 | 0 | running | 45 |
| 4 | 12 | 4 | Todd Gilliland | Kyle Busch Motorsports | Toyota | 147 | 60 | running | 36 |
| 5 | 15 | 02 | Austin Hill | Young's Motorsports | Chevrolet | 147 | 0 | running | 41 |
| 6 | 8 | 51 | Harrison Burton | Kyle Busch Motorsports | Toyota | 147 | 0 | running | 31 |
| 7 | 10 | 97 | Jesse Little | JJL Motorsports | Ford | 147 | 0 | running | 30 |
| 8 | 3 | 52 | Stewart Friesen | Halmar Friesen Racing | Chevrolet | 147 | 12 | running | 37 |
| 9 | 14 | 88 | Matt Crafton | ThorSport Racing | Ford | 147 | 0 | running | 41 |
| 10 | 2 | 18 | Noah Gragson | Kyle Busch Motorsports | Toyota | 147 | 2 | running | 32 |
| 11 | 1 | 21 | Johnny Sauter | GMS Racing | Chevrolet | 147 | 1 | running | 26 |
| 12 | 13 | 98 | Grant Enfinger | ThorSport Racing | Ford | 146 | 0 | running | 36 |
| 13 | 17 | 13 | Myatt Snider | ThorSport Racing | Ford | 146 | 35 | running | 34 |
| 14 | 9 | 25 | Tyler Dippel | GMS Racing | Chevrolet | 146 | 0 | running | 27 |
| 15 | 22 | 35 | Brennan Poole | NextGen Motorsports | Toyota | 146 | 0 | running | 25 |
| 16 | 21 | 22 | Austin Wayne Self | Niece Motorsports | Chevrolet | 145 | 0 | running | 21 |
| 17 | 26 | 9 | Codie Rohrbaugh | CR7 Motorsports | Ford | 145 | 0 | running | 20 |
| 18 | 18 | 8 | Joe Nemechek | NEMCO Motorsports | Chevrolet | 145 | 0 | running | 20 |
| 19 | 28 | 45 | Justin Fontaine | Niece Motorsports | Chevrolet | 145 | 0 | running | 18 |
| 20 | 27 | 49 | Reed Sorenson | Premium Motorsports | Chevrolet | 143 | 0 | running | 17 |
| 21 | 29 | 20 | Tanner Thorson | Young's Motorsports | Chevrolet | 143 | 0 | running | 16 |
| 22 | 31 | 15 | Mike Harmon | Premium Motorsports | Chevrolet | 138 | 0 | running | 0 |
| 23 | 25 | 83 | Bayley Currey | Copp Motorsports | Chevrolet | 134 | 0 | suspension | 14 |
| 24 | 30 | 10 | Jennifer Jo Cobb | Jennifer Jo Cobb Racing | Chevrolet | 134 | 0 | running | 13 |
| 25 | 7 | 2 | Sheldon Creed | GMS Racing | Chevrolet | 133 | 2 | running | 21 |
| 26 | 19 | 38 | Ross Chastain | Niece Motorsports | Chevrolet | 112 | 0 | electrical | 0 |
| 27 | 24 | 12 | Tyler Young | Young's Motorsports | Chevrolet | 40 | 0 | crash | 10 |
| 28 | 23 | 04 | Cory Roper | Roper Racing | Ford | 40 | 0 | crash | 9 |
| 29 | 32 | 3 | Jordan Anderson | Jordan Anderson Racing | Chevrolet | 30 | 0 | overheating | 8 |
| 30 | 5 | 17 | David Gilliland | DGR-Crosley | Toyota | 14 | 0 | crash | 7 |
| 31 | 11 | 87 | Timmy Hill | NEMCO Motorsports | Chevrolet | 5 | 0 | rear gear | 0 |
| 32 | 20 | 54 | Bo LeMastus | DGR-Crosley | Toyota | 2 | 0 | crash | 5 |
Failed to qualify or withdrew
| 33 | | 33 | Josh Reaume | Reaume Brothers Racing | Chevrolet | | | | |
| 34 | | 7 | Reid Wilson | All Out Motorsports | Toyota | | | | |
| WD | | 0 | Camden Murphy | Jennifer Jo Cobb Racing | Chevrolet | | | | |
Official race results

| Previous race: 2018 Texas Roadhouse 200 | NASCAR Camping World Truck Series; 2018 season | Next race: 2018 Lucas Oil 150 |
