= 2018 Lucas Oil 150 =

22nd race of the 2018 NASCAR Camping World Truck Series

Race details
- Race 22 of 23 of the 2018 NASCAR Camping World Truck Series
- Date: November 9, 2018
- Official name: 24th Annual Lucas Oil 150
- Location: Avondale, Arizona, ISM Raceway
- Course: Permanent racing facility
- Course length: 1 miles (1.6 km)
- Distance: 150 laps, 150 mi (241.401 km)
- Scheduled distance: 150 laps, 150 mi (241.401 km)
- Average speed: 95.004 miles per hour (152.894 km/h)

Pole position
| Driver | Noah Gragson | Kyle Busch Motorsports |
- Time: 26.456

Most laps led
| Driver | Harrison Burton | Kyle Busch Motorsports |
- Laps: 46

Winner
| No. 16 | Brett Moffitt | Hattori Racing Enterprises |

Television in the United States
- Network: Fox Sports 1
- Announcers: Vince Welch, Phil Parsons, Michael Waltrip

Radio in the United States
- Radio: Motor Racing Network

The 2018 Lucas Oil 150 was the 22nd stock car race of the 2018 NASCAR Camping World Truck Series, the third and final race of the Round of 6, and the 24th iteration of the event. The race was held on Friday, November 9, 2018, in Avondale, Arizona, at ISM Raceway, a 1-mile (1.6 km) permanent low-banked tri-oval race track. The race took the scheduled 150 laps to complete. At race's end, Hattori Racing Enterprises driver Brett Moffitt would win a dramatic race, passing eventual second-place Kyle Busch Motorsports driver Noah Gragson and eventual fourth-place ThorSport Racing finisher Grant Enfinger with just three to go to steal a victory and a berth in the Championship 4. The win was Moffitt's sixth career NASCAR Camping World Truck Series win and his fifth of the season. To fill out the podium, Harrison Burton of Kyle Busch Motorsports would finish third.

== Background ==
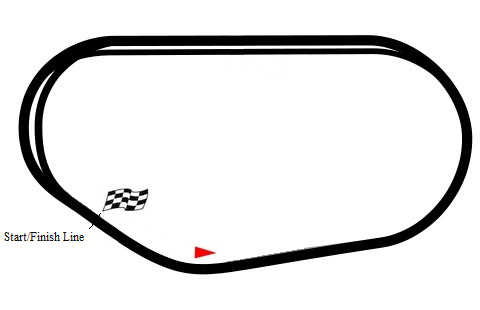
The layout of ISM Raceway, the venue where the race was held.

ISM Raceway – also known as PIR – is a one-mile, low-banked tri-oval race track located in Avondale, Arizona. It is named after the nearby metropolitan area of Phoenix. The motorsport track opened in 1964 and currently hosts two NASCAR race weekends annually. PIR has also hosted the IndyCar Series, CART, USAC and the Rolex Sports Car Series. The raceway is currently owned and operated by International Speedway Corporation.

The raceway was originally constructed with a 2.5 mi (4.0 km) road course that ran both inside and outside of the main tri-oval. In 1991 the track was reconfigured with the current 1.51 mi (2.43 km) interior layout. PIR has an estimated grandstand seating capacity of around 67,000. Lights were installed around the track in 2004 following the addition of a second annual NASCAR race weekend.

ISM Raceway is home to two annual NASCAR race weekends, one of 13 facilities on the NASCAR schedule to host more than one race weekend a year. The track is both the first and last stop in the western United States, as well as the fourth and penultimate track on the schedule.

=== Entry list ===
| # | Driver | Team | Make | Sponsor |
|---|---|---|---|---|
| 2 | Sheldon Creed | GMS Racing | Chevrolet | United Rentals |
| 02 | Austin Hill | Young's Motorsports | Chevrolet | Randco, Young's Building Systems |
| 3 | Jordan Anderson | Jordan Anderson Racing | Chevrolet | Commercial Property Services |
| 4 | Todd Gilliland | Kyle Busch Motorsports | Toyota | Pedigree |
| 8 | John Hunter Nemechek | NEMCO Motorsports | Chevrolet | Stonefield Home, Hostetler Ranch |
| 10 | Jennifer Jo Cobb | Jennifer Jo Cobb Racing | Chevrolet | Driven2Honor.org |
| 13 | Myatt Snider | ThorSport Racing | Ford | Tenda |
| 15 | Stefan Parsons | Premium Motorsports | Chevrolet | VIP Racing Experience |
| 16 | Brett Moffitt | Hattori Racing Enterprises | Toyota | Kobe Toyopet |
| 17 | Tyler Ankrum | DGR-Crosley | Toyota | May's Hawaii |
| 18 | Noah Gragson | Kyle Busch Motorsports | Toyota | Safelite Auto Glass |
| 19 | Derek Kraus | Bill McAnally Racing | Toyota | NAPA Auto Parts |
| 20 | Tanner Thorson | Young's Motorsports | Chevrolet | GoShare |
| 21 | Johnny Sauter | GMS Racing | Chevrolet | ISM Connect |
| 22 | Austin Wayne Self | Niece Motorsports | Chevrolet | AM Technical Solutions, GO TEXAN. |
| 24 | Justin Haley | GMS Racing | Chevrolet | Fraternal Order of Eagles |
| 25 | Tyler Dippel | GMS Racing | Chevrolet | Alesso |
| 33 | Josh Reaume | Reaume Brothers Racing | Chevrolet | YourGMCTruckStore.com |
| 38 | Landon Huffman | Niece Motorsports | Chevrolet | Arizona Department of Public Safety "Never Forgotten" |
| 41 | Ben Rhodes | ThorSport Racing | Ford | The Carolina Nut Company |
| 45 | Justin Fontaine | Niece Motorsports | Chevrolet | ProMatic Automation |
| 46 | Christian Eckes | Kyle Busch Motorsports | Toyota | Mobil 1 |
| 49 | D. J. Kennington | Premium Motorsports | Chevrolet | SobrietyNation.org |
| 51 | Harrison Burton | Kyle Busch Motorsports | Toyota | DEX Imaging |
| 52 | Stewart Friesen | Halmar Friesen Racing | Chevrolet | Halmar "We Build America" |
| 54 | Riley Herbst | DGR-Crosley | Toyota | Advance Auto Parts |
| 63 | Jesse Iwuji | MB Motorsports | Chevrolet | Principal Jets |
| 83 | Dawson Cram | Copp Motorsports | Chevrolet | RGS Products |
| 87 | Joe Nemechek | NEMCO Motorsports | Chevrolet | D.A.B. Constructors, Inc. |
| 88 | Matt Crafton | ThorSport Racing | Ford | Menards, Ideal Door |
| 98 | Grant Enfinger | ThorSport Racing | Ford | Protect the Harvest |
| 99 | Chase Purdy | MDM Motorsports | Chevrolet | Bama Buggies |
Official entry list

== Practice ==
=== First practice ===
The first practice session was held on Friday, November 9, at 8:30 AM MST, and would last for 50 minutes. Harrison Burton of Kyle Busch Motorsports would set the fastest time in the session, with a time of 26.583 and an average speed of 135.425 miles per hour (217.945 km/h).

| Pos. | # | Driver | Team | Make | Time | Speed |
|---|---|---|---|---|---|---|
| 1 | 51 | Harrison Burton | Kyle Busch Motorsports | Toyota | 26.583 | 135.425 |
| 2 | 18 | Noah Gragson | Kyle Busch Motorsports | Toyota | 26.597 | 135.354 |
| 3 | 41 | Ben Rhodes | ThorSport Racing | Ford | 26.698 | 134.842 |
Full first practice results

=== Second and final practice ===
The second and final practice session, sometimes referred to as Happy Hour, was held on Friday, November 9, at 10:05 AM MST, and would last for 50 minutes. Harrison Burton of Kyle Busch Motorsports would set the fastest time in the session, with a time of 26.447 and an average speed of 136.121 miles per hour (219.066 km/h).

| Pos. | # | Driver | Team | Make | Time | Speed |
|---|---|---|---|---|---|---|
| 1 | 51 | Harrison Burton | Kyle Busch Motorsports | Toyota | 26.447 | 136.121 |
| 2 | 18 | Noah Gragson | Kyle Busch Motorsports | Toyota | 26.560 | 135.542 |
| 3 | 24 | Justin Haley | GMS Racing | Chevrolet | 26.600 | 135.338 |
Full Happy Hour practice results

== Qualifying ==
Qualifying was held on Friday, November 9, at 3:35 AM MST. Since ISM Raceway is under 1.5 miles (2.4 km), the qualifying system was a multi-car system that included three rounds. The first round was 15 minutes, where every driver would be able to set a lap within the 15 minutes. Then, the second round would consist of the fastest 24 cars in Round 1, and drivers would have 10 minutes to set a lap. Round 3 consisted of the fastest 12 drivers from Round 2, and the drivers would have 5 minutes to set a time. Whoever was fastest in Round 3 would win the pole.

Noah Gragson of Kyle Busch Motorsports would set the fastest time in Round 3 and win the pole with a 26.456 and an average speed of 136.075 miles per hour (218.991 km/h).

No drivers would fail to qualify.

=== Full qualifying results ===
| Pos. | # | Driver | Team | Make | Time (R1) | Speed (R1) | Time (R2) | Speed (R2) | Time (R3) | Speed (R3) |
|---|---|---|---|---|---|---|---|---|---|---|
| 1 | 18 | Noah Gragson | Kyle Busch Motorsports | Toyota | 26.981 | 133.427 | 26.529 | 135.701 | 26.456 | 136.075 |
| 2 | 24 | Justin Haley | GMS Racing | Chevrolet | 26.982 | 133.422 | 26.773 | 134.464 | 26.623 | 135.221 |
| 3 | 51 | Harrison Burton | Kyle Busch Motorsports | Toyota | 26.935 | 133.655 | 26.575 | 135.466 | 26.689 | 134.887 |
| 4 | 52 | Stewart Friesen | Halmar Friesen Racing | Chevrolet | 27.043 | 133.121 | 26.868 | 133.988 | 26.694 | 134.862 |
| 5 | 16 | Brett Moffitt | Hattori Racing Enterprises | Toyota | 26.958 | 133.541 | 26.639 | 135.140 | 26.702 | 134.821 |
| 6 | 41 | Ben Rhodes | ThorSport Racing | Ford | 27.029 | 133.190 | 26.708 | 134.791 | 26.720 | 134.731 |
| 7 | 8 | John Hunter Nemechek | NEMCO Motorsports | Chevrolet | 27.089 | 132.895 | 26.721 | 134.725 | 26.729 | 134.685 |
| 8 | 19 | Derek Kraus | Bill McAnally Racing | Toyota | 27.364 | 131.560 | 26.884 | 133.909 | 26.761 | 134.524 |
| 9 | 88 | Matt Crafton | ThorSport Racing | Ford | 27.226 | 132.227 | 26.769 | 134.484 | 26.786 | 134.399 |
| 10 | 4 | Todd Gilliland | Kyle Busch Motorsports | Toyota | 27.078 | 132.949 | 26.819 | 134.233 | 26.815 | 134.253 |
| 11 | 46 | Christian Eckes | Kyle Busch Motorsports | Toyota | 27.164 | 132.528 | 26.788 | 134.389 | 26.845 | 134.103 |
| 12 | 98 | Grant Enfinger | ThorSport Racing | Ford | 27.249 | 132.115 | 26.878 | 133.939 | 26.867 | 133.993 |
Eliminated in Round 2
| 13 | 25 | Tyler Dippel | GMS Racing | Chevrolet | 27.367 | 131.545 | 26.891 | 133.874 | — | — |
| 14 | 21 | Johnny Sauter | GMS Racing | Chevrolet | 27.419 | 131.296 | 26.897 | 133.844 | — | — |
| 15 | 17 | Tyler Ankrum | DGR-Crosley | Toyota | 27.251 | 132.105 | 26.907 | 133.794 | — | — |
| 16 | 2 | Sheldon Creed | GMS Racing | Chevrolet | 27.198 | 132.363 | 26.925 | 133.705 | — | — |
| 17 | 13 | Myatt Snider | ThorSport Racing | Ford | 27.262 | 132.052 | 27.017 | 133.249 | — | — |
| 18 | 54 | Riley Herbst | DGR-Crosley | Toyota | 27.065 | 133.013 | 27.121 | 132.738 | — | — |
| 19 | 99 | Chase Purdy | MDM Motorsports | Chevrolet | 27.328 | 131.733 | 27.136 | 132.665 | — | — |
| 20 | 02 | Austin Hill | Young's Motorsports | Chevrolet | 27.505 | 130.885 | 27.219 | 132.261 | — | — |
| 21 | 20 | Tanner Thorson | Young's Motorsports | Chevrolet | 27.519 | 130.819 | 27.294 | 131.897 | — | — |
| 22 | 22 | Austin Wayne Self | Niece Motorsports | Chevrolet | 27.247 | 132.125 | 27.540 | 130.719 | — | — |
| 23 | 87 | Joe Nemechek | NEMCO Motorsports | Chevrolet | 27.447 | 131.162 | 27.541 | 130.714 | — | — |
| 24 | 15 | Stefan Parsons | Premium Motorsports | Chevrolet | 27.520 | 130.814 | — | — | — | — |
Eliminated in Round 1
| 25 | 3 | Jordan Anderson | Jordan Anderson Racing | Chevrolet | 27.555 | 130.648 | — | — | — | — |
| 26 | 38 | Landon Huffman | Niece Motorsports | Chevrolet | 27.635 | 130.270 | — | — | — | — |
| 27 | 45 | Justin Fontaine | Niece Motorsports | Chevrolet | 27.653 | 130.185 | — | — | — | — |
Qualified by owner's points
| 28 | 33 | Jason White | Reaume Brothers Racing | Chevrolet | 27.884 | 129.106 | — | — | — | — |
| 29 | 83 | Dawson Cram | Copp Motorsports | Chevrolet | 28.002 | 128.562 | — | — | — | — |
| 30 | 49 | D. J. Kennington | Premium Motorsports | Chevrolet | 28.177 | 127.764 | — | — | — | — |
| 31 | 10 | Jennifer Jo Cobb | Jennifer Jo Cobb Racing | Chevrolet | 29.173 | 123.402 | — | — | — | — |
| 32 | 63 | Jesse Iwuji | MB Motorsports | Chevrolet | 29.340 | 122.699 | — | — | — | — |
Official qualifying results
Official starting lineup

== Race results ==
Stage 1 Laps: 45

| Pos. | # | Driver | Team | Make | Pts |
|---|---|---|---|---|---|
| 1 | 16 | Brett Moffitt | Hattori Racing Enterprises | Toyota | 10 |
| 2 | 18 | Noah Gragson | Kyle Busch Motorsports | Toyota | 9 |
| 3 | 52 | Stewart Friesen | Halmar Friesen Racing | Chevrolet | 8 |
| 4 | 51 | Harrison Burton | Kyle Busch Motorsports | Toyota | 7 |
| 5 | 8 | John Hunter Nemechek | NEMCO Motorsports | Chevrolet | 0 |
| 6 | 24 | Justin Haley | GMS Racing | Chevrolet | 5 |
| 7 | 88 | Matt Crafton | ThorSport Racing | Ford | 4 |
| 8 | 21 | Johnny Sauter | GMS Racing | Chevrolet | 3 |
| 9 | 41 | Ben Rhodes | ThorSport Racing | Ford | 2 |
| 10 | 46 | Christian Eckes | Kyle Busch Motorsports | Toyota | 1 |

Stage 2 Laps: 45

| Pos. | # | Driver | Team | Make | Pts |
|---|---|---|---|---|---|
| 1 | 51 | Harrison Burton | Kyle Busch Motorsports | Toyota | 10 |
| 2 | 88 | Matt Crafton | ThorSport Racing | Ford | 9 |
| 3 | 52 | Stewart Friesen | Halmar Friesen Racing | Chevrolet | 8 |
| 4 | 24 | Justin Haley | GMS Racing | Chevrolet | 7 |
| 5 | 41 | Ben Rhodes | ThorSport Racing | Ford | 6 |
| 6 | 98 | Grant Enfinger | ThorSport Racing | Ford | 5 |
| 7 | 16 | Brett Moffitt | Hattori Racing Enterprises | Toyota | 4 |
| 8 | 18 | Noah Gragson | Kyle Busch Motorsports | Toyota | 3 |
| 9 | 8 | John Hunter Nemechek | NEMCO Motorsports | Chevrolet | 0 |
| 10 | 19 | Derek Kraus | Bill McAnally Racing | Toyota | 1 |

Stage 3 Laps: 60

| Fin | St | # | Driver | Team | Make | Laps | Led | Status | Pts |
|---|---|---|---|---|---|---|---|---|---|
| 1 | 5 | 16 | Brett Moffitt | Hattori Racing Enterprises | Toyota | 150 | 19 | running | 54 |
| 2 | 1 | 18 | Noah Gragson | Kyle Busch Motorsports | Toyota | 150 | 43 | running | 47 |
| 3 | 3 | 51 | Harrison Burton | Kyle Busch Motorsports | Toyota | 150 | 46 | running | 51 |
| 4 | 12 | 98 | Grant Enfinger | ThorSport Racing | Ford | 150 | 10 | running | 38 |
| 5 | 4 | 52 | Stewart Friesen | Halmar Friesen Racing | Chevrolet | 150 | 0 | running | 48 |
| 6 | 15 | 17 | Tyler Ankrum | DGR-Crosley | Toyota | 150 | 0 | running | 31 |
| 7 | 14 | 21 | Johnny Sauter | GMS Racing | Chevrolet | 150 | 0 | running | 33 |
| 8 | 8 | 19 | Derek Kraus | Bill McAnally Racing | Toyota | 150 | 0 | running | 30 |
| 9 | 11 | 46 | Christian Eckes | Kyle Busch Motorsports | Toyota | 150 | 0 | running | 29 |
| 10 | 16 | 2 | Sheldon Creed | GMS Racing | Chevrolet | 150 | 0 | running | 27 |
| 11 | 9 | 88 | Matt Crafton | ThorSport Racing | Ford | 150 | 1 | running | 39 |
| 12 | 6 | 41 | Ben Rhodes | ThorSport Racing | Ford | 150 | 0 | running | 33 |
| 13 | 19 | 99 | Chase Purdy | MDM Motorsports | Chevrolet | 150 | 0 | running | 24 |
| 15 | 18 | 54 | Riley Herbst | DGR-Crosley | Toyota | 150 | 0 | running | 22 |
| 14 | 13 | 25 | Tyler Dippel | GMS Racing | Chevrolet | 150 | 0 | running | 23 |
| 16 | 29 | 83 | Dawson Cram | Copp Motorsports | Chevrolet | 150 | 0 | running | 21 |
| 17 | 10 | 4 | Todd Gilliland | Kyle Busch Motorsports | Toyota | 150 | 0 | running | 20 |
| 18 | 21 | 20 | Tanner Thorson | Young's Motorsports | Chevrolet | 150 | 0 | running | 19 |
| 19 | 22 | 22 | Austin Wayne Self | Niece Motorsports | Chevrolet | 150 | 0 | running | 18 |
| 20 | 24 | 15 | Stefan Parsons | Premium Motorsports | Chevrolet | 148 | 0 | running | 17 |
| 21 | 30 | 49 | D. J. Kennington | Premium Motorsports | Chevrolet | 148 | 0 | running | 16 |
| 22 | 17 | 13 | Myatt Snider | ThorSport Racing | Ford | 147 | 0 | running | 15 |
| 23 | 25 | 3 | Jordan Anderson | Jordan Anderson Racing | Chevrolet | 147 | 0 | running | 14 |
| 24 | 27 | 45 | Justin Fontaine | Niece Motorsports | Chevrolet | 147 | 0 | running | 13 |
| 25 | 26 | 38 | Landon Huffman | Niece Motorsports | Chevrolet | 146 | 0 | running | 12 |
| 26 | 28 | 33 | Jason White | Reaume Brothers Racing | Chevrolet | 143 | 0 | running | 11 |
| 27 | 32 | 63 | Jesse Iwuji | MB Motorsports | Chevrolet | 138 | 0 | running | 10 |
| 28 | 2 | 24 | Justin Haley | GMS Racing | Chevrolet | 131 | 0 | oil leak | 21 |
| 29 | 7 | 8 | John Hunter Nemechek | NEMCO Motorsports | Chevrolet | 128 | 31 | suspension | 0 |
| 30 | 20 | 02 | Austin Hill | Young's Motorsports | Chevrolet | 57 | 0 | engine | 7 |
| 31 | 31 | 10 | Jennifer Jo Cobb | Jennifer Jo Cobb Racing | Chevrolet | 30 | 0 | header | 6 |
| 32 | 23 | 87 | Joe Nemechek | NEMCO Motorsports | Chevrolet | 11 | 0 | electrical | 5 |
Official race results

| Previous race: 2018 JAG Metals 350 | NASCAR Camping World Truck Series; 2018 season | Next race: 2018 Ford EcoBoost 200 |
