= Reid Wilson =

American racing driver (born 1996)

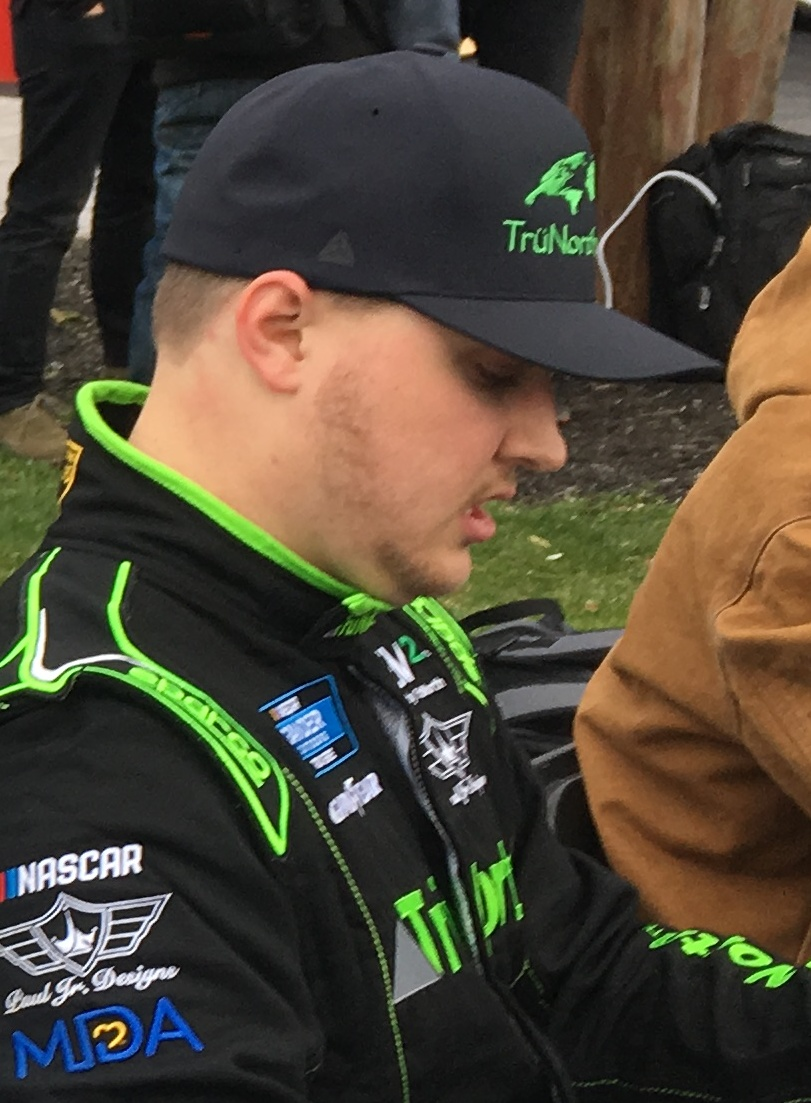
- Wilson signing autographs at Martinsville Speedway in 2019
- Born: Reid D. Wilson; May 30, 1996 (age 30); Charlotte, North Carolina, U.S.
- Height: 4’11

NASCAR FedEx Freight Truck Series career
- 5 races run over 2 years
- 2019 position: 74th
- Best finish: 56th (2018)
- First race: 2018 Alpha Energy Solutions 250 (Martinsville)
- Last race: 2019 JEGS 200 (Dover)
Wins	Top tens	Poles
0	0	0
- Statistics up to date as of October 31, 2020.

Reid D. Wilson (born May 30, 1996) is an American professional stock car racing driver. He last competed part-time in the NASCAR Gander Outdoors Truck Series, driving the No. 44 Chevrolet Silverado for Niece Motorsports.

== Racing career ==
From 2013 to 2014, Wilson ran a total of twenty races in the X-1R Pro Cup Series, driving the No. 66 Chevrolet Impala SS for his own team.

Wilson ran a total of four NASCAR K&N Pro Series East races in the 2016 and 2017 seasons for Young's Motorsports. He finished 27th in the 2016 standings, and nineteenth in the 2017 standings.

Wilson made his debut in the Truck Series in 2018 at Martinsville in the No. 20 Chevrolet Silverado for Young’s Motorsports. He finished 16th after starting 20th. Wilson returned to the team for the race at Iowa in one of their other trucks, the No. 12, and finished 28th.

In 2019, Wilson was announced to split the No. 45 Silverado for Niece Motorsports with Ross Chastain. However, when Chastain started performing well and winning races in his part-time schedule of races in the No. 45, he ended up running full-time in that truck and Wilson was moved to Niece's other truck, the No. 44, where he ran two races before he and sponsor TrüNorth eventually left the team. Wilson did not compete in any races with another team for the remainder of the season as well as all of 2020.

== Motorsports career results ==
=== NASCAR ===
(key) (Bold – Pole position awarded by qualifying time. Italics – Pole position earned by points standings or practice time. * – Most laps led.)

==== Gander Outdoors Truck Series ====
NASCAR Gander Outdoors Truck Series results
Year	Team	No.	Make	1	2	3	4	5	6	7	8	9	10	11	12	13	14	15	16	17	18	19	20	21	22	23	NGOTC	Pts	Ref
2018	Young's Motorsports	20	Chevy	DAY	ATL	LVS	MAR; 16	DOV	KAN	CLT	TEX																56th	37	
2018	Young's Motorsports	12	Chevy									IOW; 28	GTW	CHI	KEN	ELD	POC	MCH	BRI	MSP	LVS	TAL	MAR				56th	37	
2018	All Out Motorsports	7	Toyota																					TEX; DNQ	PHO		56th	37	
2018	Premium Motorsports	15	Chevy																							HOM; 30	56th	37	
2019	Niece Motorsports	44	Chevy	DAY	ATL	LVS	MAR; 24	TEX	DOV; 28	KAN	CLT	TEX	IOW	GTW	CHI	KEN	POC	ELD	MCH	BRI	MSP	LVS	TAL	MAR	PHO	HOM	74th	22	

==== K&N Pro Series East ====
NASCAR K&N Pro Series East results
Year	Team	No.	Make	1	2	3	4	5	6	7	8	9	10	11	12	13	14	NKNPSEC	Pts	Ref
2016	Young's Motorsports	66	Chevy	NSM; 17	MOB	GRE; 6	BRI	VIR	DOM; 10	STA	COL	NHA; 28	IOW	GLN	GRE	NJM	DOV	27th	115	
2017	Young's Motorsports	66	Chevy	NSM; 6	GRE; 10	BRI; 20	SBO	SBO	MEM	BLN	TMP	NHA	IOW; 15	GLN	LGY	NJM	DOV	19th	125	

^{*} Season still in progress
^{1} Ineligible for series points
