= Justin Fontaine (racing driver) =

American auto racing driver

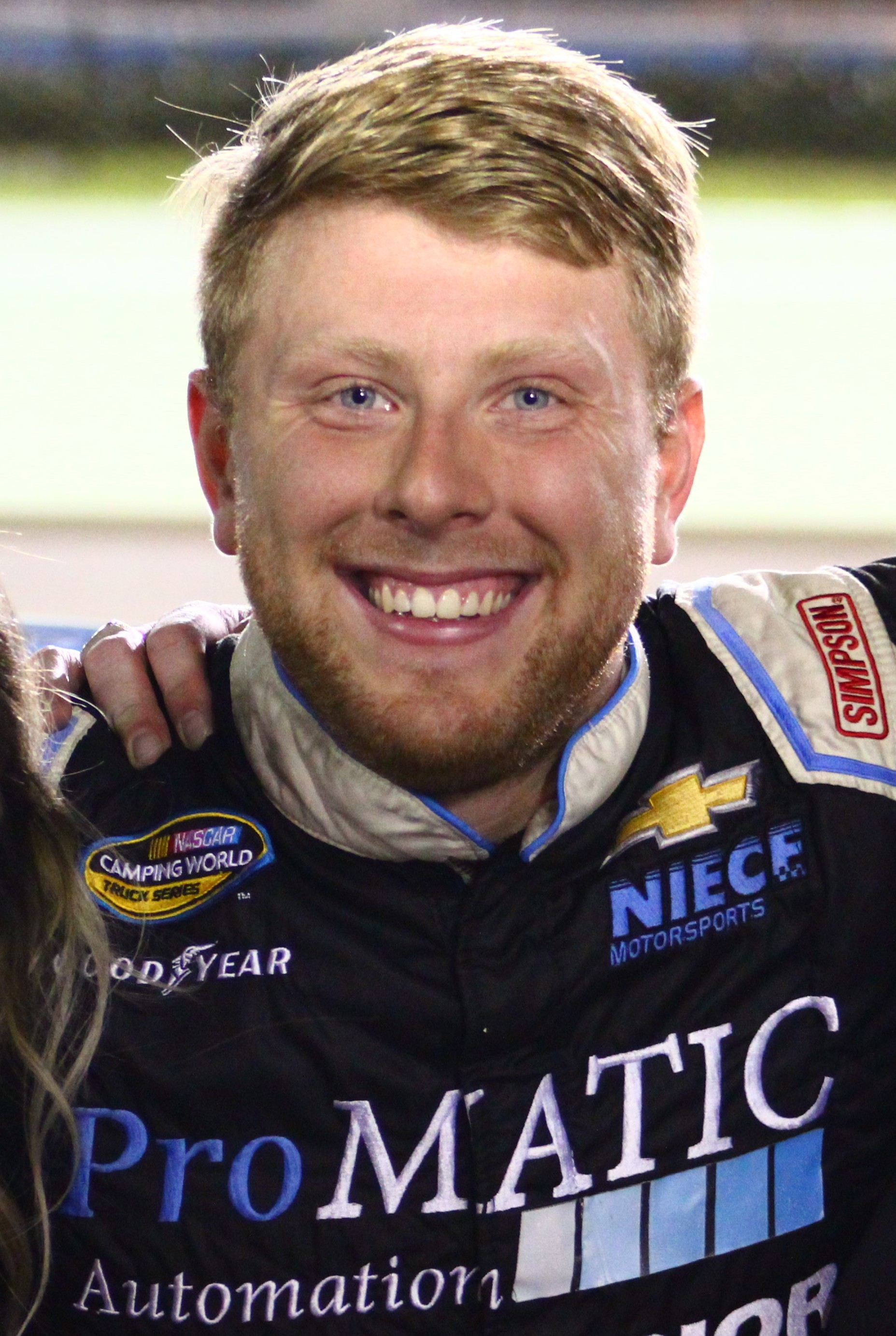
- Fontaine at Homestead–Miami Speedway in 2018
- Born: October 18, 1997 (age 29); Fletcher, North Carolina, U.S.

NASCAR FedEx Freight Truck Series career
- 26 races run over 3 years
- 2018 position: 16th
- Best finish: 16th (2018)
- First race: 2016 Texas Roadhouse 200 (Martinsville)
- Last race: 2018 Ford EcoBoost 200 (Homestead)
Wins	Top tens	Poles
0	2	0
- Statistics up to date as of November 16, 2018.

Justin Fontaine (born October 18, 1997) is an American former professional stock car racing driver. He last competed full-time in the NASCAR Camping World Truck Series, driving the No. 45 Chevrolet Silverado for Niece Motorsports.

== Racing career ==
Before breaking into NASCAR, racing was a hobby for Fontaine. He raced quarter midgets, Mini Cup cars, late models, and drove a few races in the K&N Pro Series East.

In 2016, Fontaine made his Camping World Truck Series debut at Martinsville Speedway, driving the No. 22 Toyota for AM Racing. After starting 28th, he finished 26th, five laps behind race winner Johnny Sauter. Fontaine remained with AM Racing in 2017, driving on a part-time basis. His first race with AM was through a partnership with Bolen Motorsports, driving the No. 66 truck at Pocono Raceway. He then joined Niece Motorsports for a race later in the season.

On February 18, 2017, Fontaine was racing in the Lucas Oil Complete Engine Treatment 200, an ARCA Racing Series event at Daytona International Speedway. With five laps to go, he was involved in a multi-car wreck that sent him sliding on his roof. His car hit the outside wall in the tri-oval hard, and he had to be extricated from the car and was taken to nearby Halifax Medical Center. Due to damage to the SAFER barrier caused by Fontaine's hit, as well as the looming threat of rain that ended up postponing the Advance Auto Parts Clash to Sunday, the race was called at lap 75, with Austin Theriault the winner. Fontaine ended up with a L1 compression fracture from the accident. He was cleared to return to racing on May 30, 2017 and hinted at a schedule that included another ARCA race and more NASCAR races. Fontaine ran most of the remaining ARCA events in Win-Tron Racing's No. 33 entry, running mostly just outside of the top ten. He scored a best finish of ninth at Winchester Speedway.

On December 12, 2017, it was announced that Fontaine would pilot Niece Motorsports' No. 45 truck full-time in 2018, working alongside Austin Wayne Self. In his first race in the 45, Fontaine scored his first top ten in the Truck Series, finishing tenth. In an interview after the finish, Fontaine exuded happiness about the finish, saying in part "it’s nice because my Wikipedia stats are going to have one less zero in them!"

Two races later at Las Vegas, Fontaine scored his second top-ten. Fontaine and the team struggled throughout the rest of the year, with multiple incidents and other misfortunes plaguing the team, which led them to a final points position of 16th.

On September 17, 2018, Fontaine announced that after the conclusion of the 2018 NASCAR Camping World Truck Series Season at Homestead–Miami Speedway he would step away from racing indefinitely.

== Personal life ==
Fontaine's older cousin Chris has also competed in the Truck Series. Fontaine attended UNC Charlotte.

After ending his racing career, Fontaine interned for North Carolina Representative Patrick McHenry in 2019, and was promoted to deputy campaign manager for the following year's election cycle.

== Motorsports career results ==
=== NASCAR ===
(key) (Bold – Pole position awarded by qualifying time. Italics – Pole position earned by points standings or practice time. * – Most laps led.)

==== Camping World Truck Series ====
NASCAR Camping World Truck Series results
Year	Team	No.	Make	1	2	3	4	5	6	7	8	9	10	11	12	13	14	15	16	17	18	19	20	21	22	23	NCWTC	Pts	Ref
2016	AM Racing	22	Toyota	DAY	ATL	MAR	KAN	DOV	CLT	TEX	IOW	GTW	KEN	ELD	POC	BRI	MCH	MSP	CHI	NHA	LVS	TAL	MAR; 26	TEX	PHO	HOM	70th	7	
2017	AM Racing	66	Toyota	DAY	ATL	MAR	KAN	CLT	DOV	TEX	GTW	IOW	KEN	ELD	POC; 15	MCH	BRI	MSP									46th	42	
2017	Niece Motorsports	45	Toyota																CHI; 17	NHA	LVS	TAL	MAR	TEX	PHO	HOM	46th	42	
2018	Niece Motorsports	45	Chevy	DAY; 10	ATL; 19	LVS; 9	MAR; 28	DOV; 19	KAN; 17	CLT; 30	TEX; 30	IOW; 12	GTW; 26	CHI; 14	KEN; 17	ELD; 25	POC; 17	MCH; 25	BRI; 24	MSP; 18	LVS; 14	TAL; 21	MAR; 27	TEX; 19	PHO; 24	HOM; 22	16th	386	

==== K&N Pro Series East ====
NASCAR K&N Pro Series East results
Year	Team	No.	Make	1	2	3	4	5	6	7	8	9	10	11	12	13	14	NKNPSEC	Pts	Ref
2016	Martin-McClure Racing	39	Toyota	NSM	MOB	GRE	BRI	VIR	DOM; 13	STA; 20	COL	NHA			GRE; 16	NJE	DOV	28th	113	
2016	Martin-McClure Racing	75	Toyota										IOW; 14	GLN				28th	113	

^{*} Season still in progress
^{1} Ineligible for series points

=== ARCA Racing Series ===
(key) (Bold – Pole position awarded by qualifying time. Italics – Pole position earned by points standings or practice time. * – Most laps led.)

ARCA Racing Series results
Year	Team	No.	Make	1	2	3	4	5	6	7	8	9	10	11	12	13	14	15	16	17	18	19	20	ARSC	Pts	Ref
2017	Win-Tron Racing	33	Toyota	DAY; 13	NSH	SLM	TAL	TOL	ELK; 11	POC; 21	MCH; 26	MAD; 11	IOW; 23	IRP; 22	POC; 26	WIN; 9	ISF	ROA	DSF	SLM; 11	CHI; 15	KEN; 10	KAN; 14	14th	2180	
