= 2018 NASCAR Camping World Truck Series =

American motorsport season

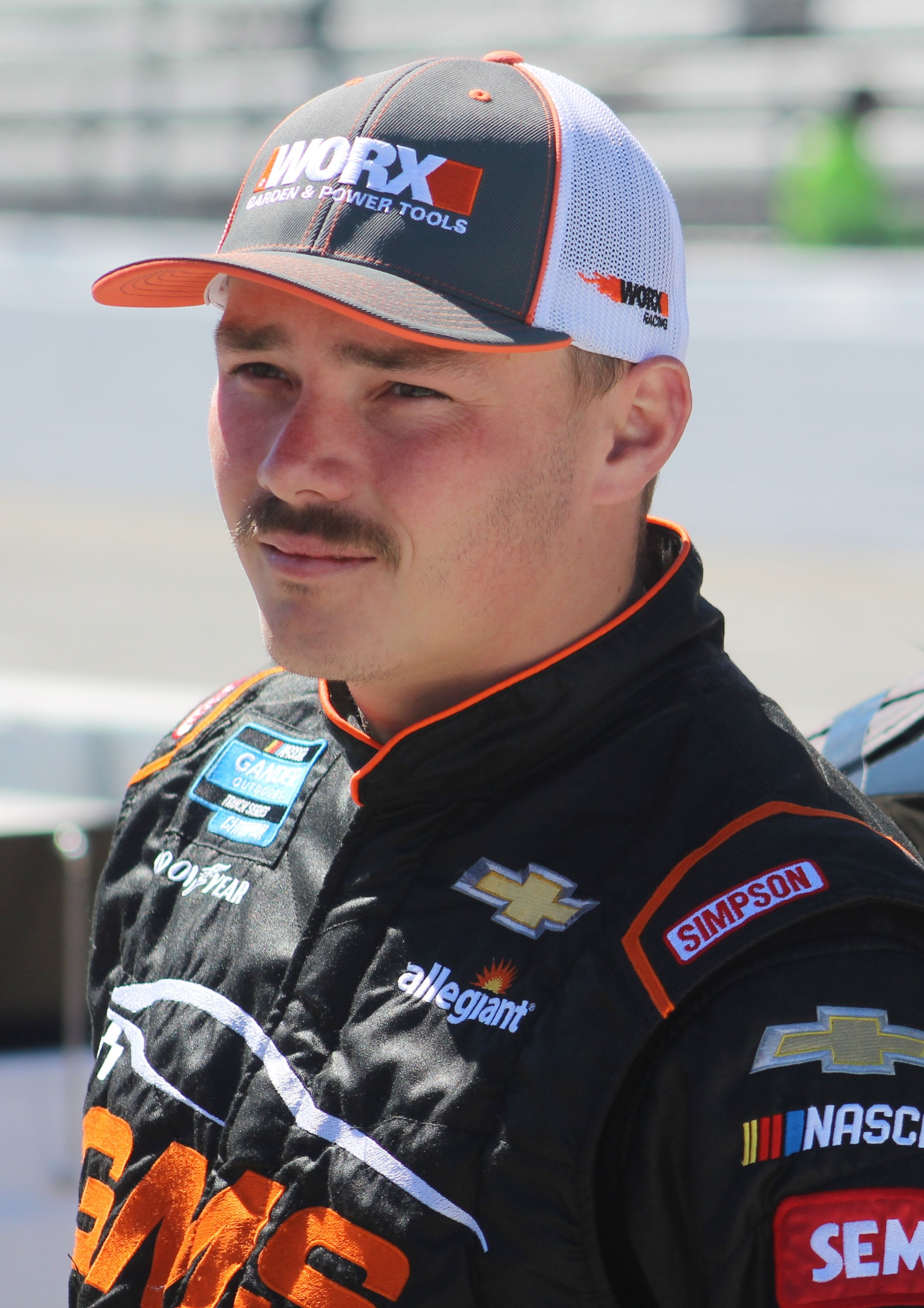
Brett Moffitt, shown here in 2019, the 2018 Camping World Truck Series champion.

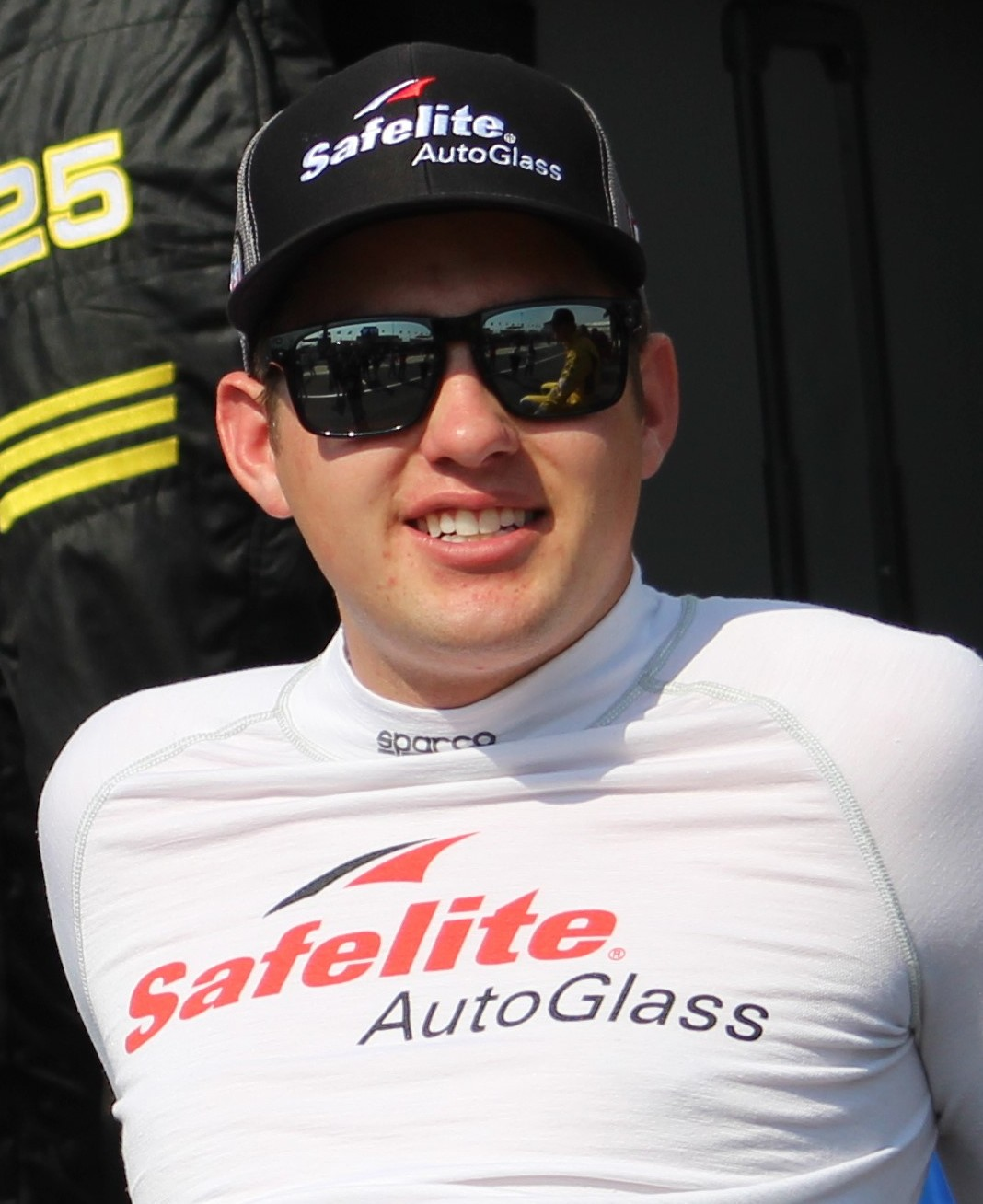
Noah Gragson finished second behind Moffitt in the championship.

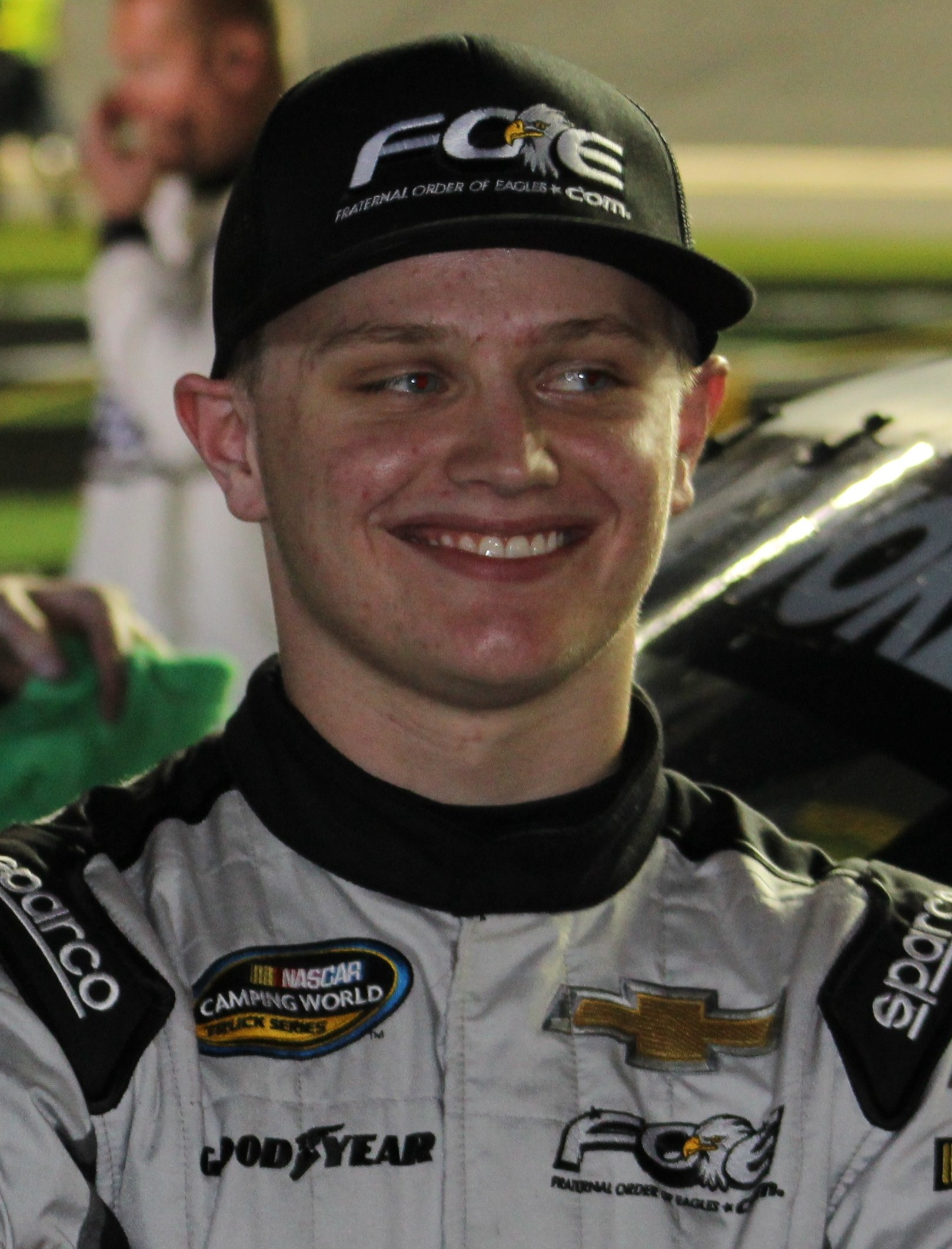
Justin Haley finished third in the championship.

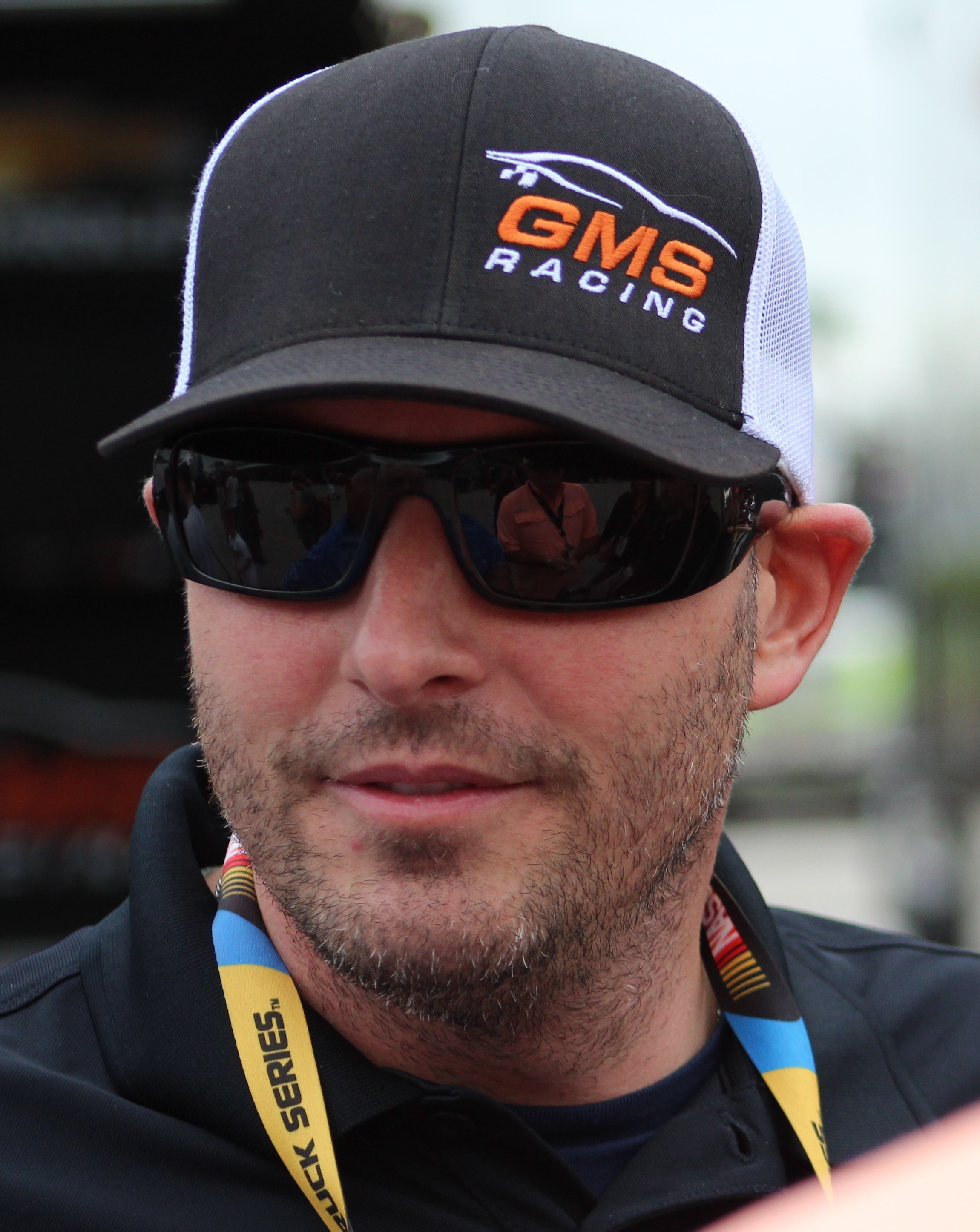
Johnny Sauter, the 2016 champion, finished fourth in the championship. He was also the Regular season champion.

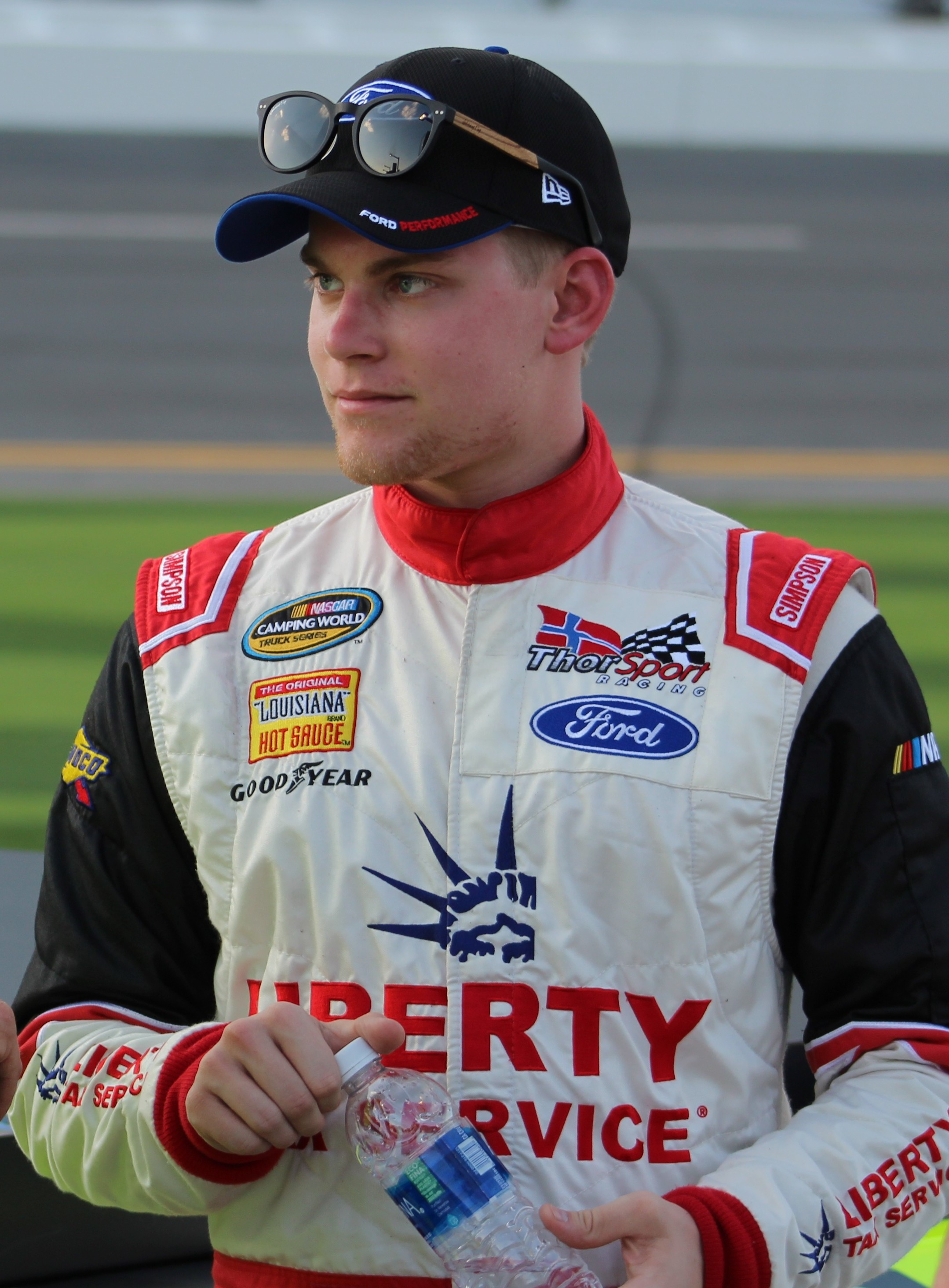
Myatt Snider won the Rookie of the Year title.

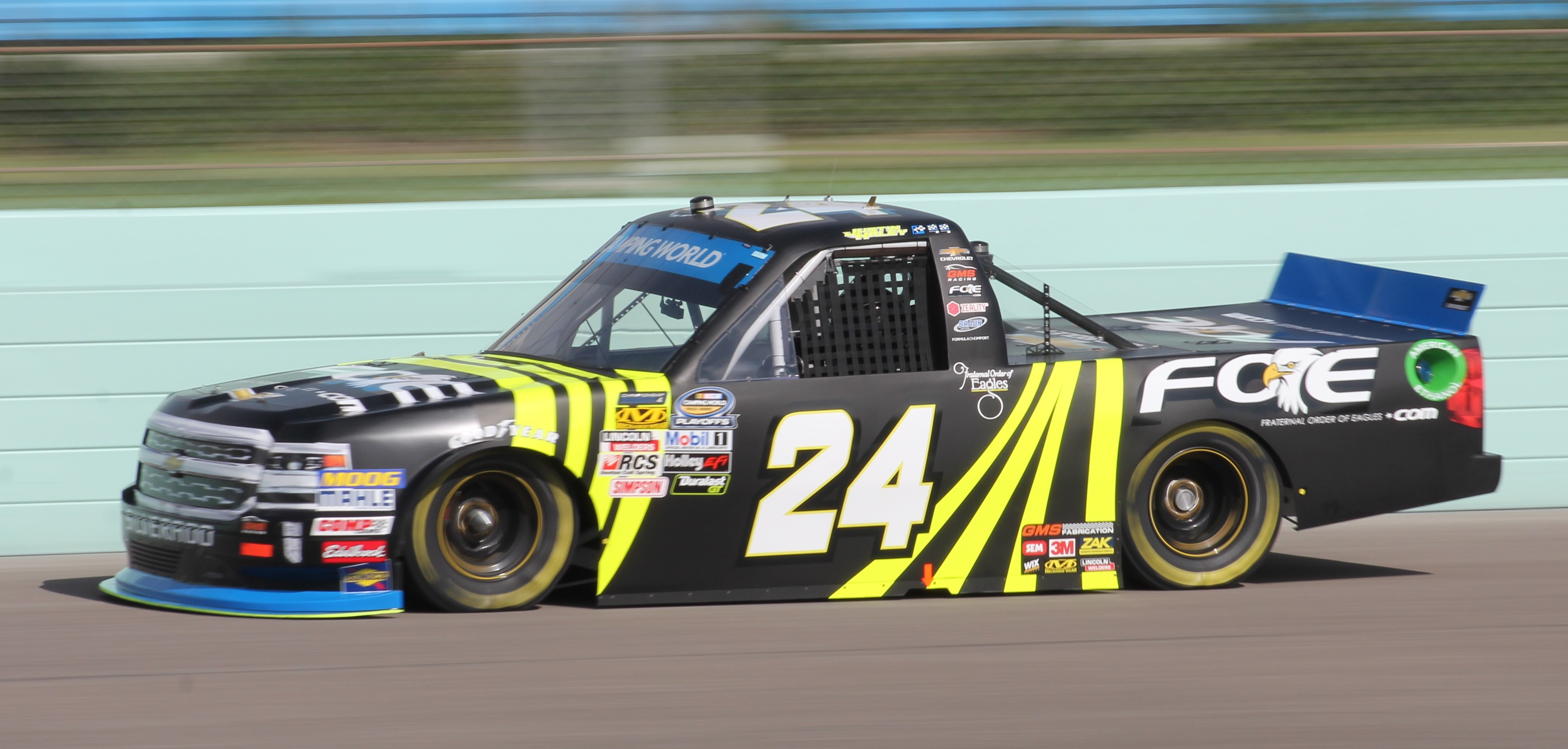
Chevrolet won the manufacturer's championship with 11 wins and 847 points.

The 2018 NASCAR Camping World Truck Series was the 24th season of the Camping World Truck Series a pickup truck racing series sanctioned by NASCAR. Christopher Bell entered as the defending champion, but he did not defend his championship, leaving his No. 4 Kyle Busch Motorsports entry to a number of drivers throughout the season, with Todd Gilliland covering the majority of the schedule in the truck. Title sponsor Camping World Holdings rebranded the series with their Gander Outdoors brand they acquired in 2017 for the 2019 season, replacing the Camping World brand.

This was the third year that the Truck Series (and the Xfinity Series) had a playoff system. For the first time in the three years of the playoffs at that time, Christopher Bell and Matt Crafton were not part of the "championship 4" drivers competing for the title at Homestead. Bell had moved up to the Xfinity Series full-time, while Crafton did qualify for the postseason but did not advance to the last round of the playoffs as he had done the past two years.

The 2018 season was also the first to feature the regular season championship trophy, which was awarded at the final race before the playoffs. Johnny Sauter clinched the NCWTS Regular Season Championship trophy at the end of the UNOH 200 at Bristol Motor Speedway. Brett Moffitt was declared the NCWTS Champion for 2018, after winning the Ford EcoBoost 200 at Homestead-Miami Speedway. In addition, Hattori Racing Enterprises won the NCWTS Owners' Championship.

== Teams and drivers ==
=== Complete schedule ===
Manufacturer	Team	No.	Race driver	Crew chief
Chevrolet	GMS Racing	2	Cody Coughlin 18	Jerry Baxter 16; Doug Randolph 7
Chevrolet	GMS Racing	2	Spencer Gallagher 1	Jerry Baxter 16; Doug Randolph 7
Chevrolet	GMS Racing	2	Sheldon Creed 4	Jerry Baxter 16; Doug Randolph 7
Chevrolet	GMS Racing	21	Johnny Sauter	Joe Shear Jr.
Chevrolet	GMS Racing	24	Justin Haley	Kevin Bellicourt
Chevrolet	GMS Racing	25	Dalton Sargeant (R) 16	Doug Randolph 15; Buddy Sisco 1 Jerry Baxter 7
Chevrolet	GMS Racing	25	Timothy Peters 3	Doug Randolph 15; Buddy Sisco 1 Jerry Baxter 7
Chevrolet	GMS Racing	25	Tyler Dippel 4	Doug Randolph 15; Buddy Sisco 1 Jerry Baxter 7
Chevrolet	Halmar Friesen Racing	52	Stewart Friesen	Tripp Bruce
Chevrolet	Jennifer Jo Cobb Racing	10	Jennifer Jo Cobb	Tim Silva 22; Brian Lear 1
Chevrolet	NEMCO Motorsports	8	John Hunter Nemechek 18	Gere Kennon Jr.
Chevrolet	NEMCO Motorsports	8	Joe Nemechek 5	Gere Kennon Jr.
Chevrolet	Niece Motorsports	22	Austin Wayne Self	Joey Cohen 4 Cody Efaw 4 Arthur Haire 15
Chevrolet	Niece Motorsports	45	Justin Fontaine (R)	Darrell Morrow 7 Buddy Sisco 1 Cody Efaw 7 Adam Crigger 4 Matt Weber 4
Chevrolet	Premium Motorsports	49	Wendell Chavous 18	Brian Keselowski 8 Mike Hillman Sr. 13; Tommy Baldwin Jr. 1 Joe Lax 1
Chevrolet	Premium Motorsports	49	D. J. Kennington 4	Brian Keselowski 8 Mike Hillman Sr. 13; Tommy Baldwin Jr. 1 Joe Lax 1
Chevrolet	Premium Motorsports	49	Reed Sorenson 1	Brian Keselowski 8 Mike Hillman Sr. 13; Tommy Baldwin Jr. 1 Joe Lax 1
Chevrolet	Premium Motorsports	15	Robby Lyons (R) 7	Scott Eggleston 5 Mike Hillman Sr. 7 Tommy Baldwin Jr. 2 Jason Dorman 1 Joe Lax 1 Peter Sospenzo 1 Mark Fordham 1 Vincent Shull 2 Amanda Beaver 2 Doug George 1
Chevrolet	Premium Motorsports	15	Reed Sorenson 3	Scott Eggleston 5 Mike Hillman Sr. 7 Tommy Baldwin Jr. 2 Jason Dorman 1 Joe Lax 1 Peter Sospenzo 1 Mark Fordham 1 Vincent Shull 2 Amanda Beaver 2 Doug George 1
Chevrolet	Premium Motorsports	15	Ross Chastain 2	Scott Eggleston 5 Mike Hillman Sr. 7 Tommy Baldwin Jr. 2 Jason Dorman 1 Joe Lax 1 Peter Sospenzo 1 Mark Fordham 1 Vincent Shull 2 Amanda Beaver 2 Doug George 1
Chevrolet	Premium Motorsports	15	J. R. Heffner 1	Scott Eggleston 5 Mike Hillman Sr. 7 Tommy Baldwin Jr. 2 Jason Dorman 1 Joe Lax 1 Peter Sospenzo 1 Mark Fordham 1 Vincent Shull 2 Amanda Beaver 2 Doug George 1
Chevrolet	Premium Motorsports	15	Todd Peck 1	Scott Eggleston 5 Mike Hillman Sr. 7 Tommy Baldwin Jr. 2 Jason Dorman 1 Joe Lax 1 Peter Sospenzo 1 Mark Fordham 1 Vincent Shull 2 Amanda Beaver 2 Doug George 1
Chevrolet	Premium Motorsports	15	Stefan Parsons 2	Scott Eggleston 5 Mike Hillman Sr. 7 Tommy Baldwin Jr. 2 Jason Dorman 1 Joe Lax 1 Peter Sospenzo 1 Mark Fordham 1 Vincent Shull 2 Amanda Beaver 2 Doug George 1
Chevrolet	Premium Motorsports	15	Wendell Chavous 1	Scott Eggleston 5 Mike Hillman Sr. 7 Tommy Baldwin Jr. 2 Jason Dorman 1 Joe Lax 1 Peter Sospenzo 1 Mark Fordham 1 Vincent Shull 2 Amanda Beaver 2 Doug George 1
Chevrolet	Premium Motorsports	15	Jamie Mosley 1	Scott Eggleston 5 Mike Hillman Sr. 7 Tommy Baldwin Jr. 2 Jason Dorman 1 Joe Lax 1 Peter Sospenzo 1 Mark Fordham 1 Vincent Shull 2 Amanda Beaver 2 Doug George 1
Chevrolet	Premium Motorsports	15	Brad Foy 1	Scott Eggleston 5 Mike Hillman Sr. 7 Tommy Baldwin Jr. 2 Jason Dorman 1 Joe Lax 1 Peter Sospenzo 1 Mark Fordham 1 Vincent Shull 2 Amanda Beaver 2 Doug George 1
Chevrolet	Premium Motorsports	15	Mike Harmon 1	Scott Eggleston 5 Mike Hillman Sr. 7 Tommy Baldwin Jr. 2 Jason Dorman 1 Joe Lax 1 Peter Sospenzo 1 Mark Fordham 1 Vincent Shull 2 Amanda Beaver 2 Doug George 1
Chevrolet	Premium Motorsports	15	Reid Wilson 1	Scott Eggleston 5 Mike Hillman Sr. 7 Tommy Baldwin Jr. 2 Jason Dorman 1 Joe Lax 1 Peter Sospenzo 1 Mark Fordham 1 Vincent Shull 2 Amanda Beaver 2 Doug George 1
Chevrolet	Jordan Anderson Racing (Note: Entries were fielded by Jordan Anderson Racing in a collaboration with Premium Motorsports.)	15	Bobby Reuse 1	Scott Eggleston 5 Mike Hillman Sr. 7 Tommy Baldwin Jr. 2 Jason Dorman 1 Joe Lax 1 Peter Sospenzo 1 Mark Fordham 1 Vincent Shull 2 Amanda Beaver 2 Doug George 1
Chevrolet	Jordan Anderson Racing	15	Bryant Barnhill 1	Scott Eggleston 5 Mike Hillman Sr. 7 Tommy Baldwin Jr. 2 Jason Dorman 1 Joe Lax 1 Peter Sospenzo 1 Mark Fordham 1 Vincent Shull 2 Amanda Beaver 2 Doug George 1
Chevrolet	Young's Motorsports	02	Austin Hill	Chad Kendrick
Chevrolet	Young's Motorsports	20	Scott Lagasse Jr. 1	Andrew Abbott 22; Bruce Cook 1
Chevrolet	Young's Motorsports	20	Austin Dillon 1	Andrew Abbott 22; Bruce Cook 1
Chevrolet	Young's Motorsports	20	Michel Disdier 1	Andrew Abbott 22; Bruce Cook 1
Chevrolet	Young's Motorsports	20	Reid Wilson 1	Andrew Abbott 22; Bruce Cook 1
Chevrolet	Young's Motorsports	20	Tanner Thorson 10	Andrew Abbott 22; Bruce Cook 1
Chevrolet	Young's Motorsports	20	Bubba Wallace 1	Andrew Abbott 22; Bruce Cook 1
Chevrolet	Young's Motorsports	20	Daniel Hemric 1	Andrew Abbott 22; Bruce Cook 1
Chevrolet	Young's Motorsports	20	Tyler Young 1	Andrew Abbott 22; Bruce Cook 1
Chevrolet	Young's Motorsports	20	Tate Fogleman 3	Andrew Abbott 22; Bruce Cook 1
Chevrolet	Young's Motorsports	20	Max Tullman 3	Andrew Abbott 22; Bruce Cook 1
Ford	ThorSport Racing	13	Myatt Snider (R)	Rich Lushes
Ford	ThorSport Racing	41	Ben Rhodes	Eddie Troconis 22; Bud Haefele 1
Ford	ThorSport Racing	88	Matt Crafton	Carl Joiner Jr.
Ford	ThorSport Racing	98	Grant Enfinger	Jeff Hensley
Toyota	DGR-Crosley	54	Bo LeMastus (R) 9	Kevin Manion 20; Chris Lawson 2 Seth Smith 1
Toyota	DGR-Crosley	54	Justin Marks 1	Kevin Manion 20; Chris Lawson 2 Seth Smith 1
Toyota	DGR-Crosley	54	Kyle Benjamin 1	Kevin Manion 20; Chris Lawson 2 Seth Smith 1
Toyota	DGR-Crosley	54	David Gilliland 2	Kevin Manion 20; Chris Lawson 2 Seth Smith 1
Toyota	DGR-Crosley	54	Chris Eggleston 3	Kevin Manion 20; Chris Lawson 2 Seth Smith 1
Toyota	DGR-Crosley	54	Zane Smith 1	Kevin Manion 20; Chris Lawson 2 Seth Smith 1
Toyota	DGR-Crosley	54	Chris Windom 2	Kevin Manion 20; Chris Lawson 2 Seth Smith 1
Toyota	DGR-Crosley	54	Matt Mills 1	Kevin Manion 20; Chris Lawson 2 Seth Smith 1
Toyota	DGR-Crosley	54	Riley Herbst 2	Kevin Manion 20; Chris Lawson 2 Seth Smith 1
Toyota	DGR-Crosley	54	Tyler Ankrum 1	Kevin Manion 20; Chris Lawson 2 Seth Smith 1
Toyota	Hattori Racing Enterprises	16	Brett Moffitt	Scott Zipadelli
Toyota	Kyle Busch Motorsports	4	David Gilliland 1	Marcus Richmond 20; Wes Ward 3
Toyota	Kyle Busch Motorsports	4	Kyle Busch 2	Marcus Richmond 20; Wes Ward 3
Toyota	Kyle Busch Motorsports	4	Spencer Davis 1	Marcus Richmond 20; Wes Ward 3
Toyota	Kyle Busch Motorsports	4	Todd Gilliland (R) 19	Marcus Richmond 20; Wes Ward 3
Toyota	Kyle Busch Motorsports	18	Noah Gragson 22	Rudy Fugle
Toyota	Kyle Busch Motorsports	18	Erik Jones 1	Rudy Fugle
Toyota	Kyle Busch Motorsports	51	Spencer Davis 4	Mike Hillman Jr.
Toyota	Kyle Busch Motorsports	51	Kyle Busch 3	Mike Hillman Jr.
Toyota	Kyle Busch Motorsports	51	Harrison Burton 8	Mike Hillman Jr.
Toyota	Kyle Busch Motorsports	51	Brandon Jones 4	Mike Hillman Jr.
Toyota	Kyle Busch Motorsports	51	Riley Herbst 1	Mike Hillman Jr.
Toyota	Kyle Busch Motorsports	51	Logan Seavey 1	Mike Hillman Jr.
Toyota	Kyle Busch Motorsports	51	Christopher Bell 1	Mike Hillman Jr.
Toyota	Kyle Busch Motorsports	51	David Gilliland 1	Mike Hillman Jr.
Chevrolet 21 Toyota 2	Jordan Anderson Racing	3	Jordan Anderson 22	Dylan Corum 3 Dan Kolanda 5 Brian Keselowski 2 Kevin Eagle 13
Chevrolet 21 Toyota 2	Jordan Anderson Racing	3	Ryan Newman 1	Dylan Corum 3 Dan Kolanda 5 Brian Keselowski 2 Kevin Eagle 13
Chevrolet 15 Toyota 8	Reaume Brothers Racing	33	Josh Reaume 15	Danny Glad 4 William Tatum Jr. 2 Paul Clapprood 1 John Reaume 7 R. B. Bracken 4 Dalton Blackburn 1 Bruce Cook 3 Doug George 1
Chevrolet 15 Toyota 8	Reaume Brothers Racing	33	Braden Mitchell 1	Danny Glad 4 William Tatum Jr. 2 Paul Clapprood 1 John Reaume 7 R. B. Bracken 4 Dalton Blackburn 1 Bruce Cook 3 Doug George 1
Chevrolet 15 Toyota 8	Reaume Brothers Racing	33	B. J. McLeod 1	Danny Glad 4 William Tatum Jr. 2 Paul Clapprood 1 John Reaume 7 R. B. Bracken 4 Dalton Blackburn 1 Bruce Cook 3 Doug George 1
Chevrolet 15 Toyota 8	Reaume Brothers Racing	33	Jason White 2	Danny Glad 4 William Tatum Jr. 2 Paul Clapprood 1 John Reaume 7 R. B. Bracken 4 Dalton Blackburn 1 Bruce Cook 3 Doug George 1
Chevrolet 15 Toyota 8	Reaume Brothers Racing	33	J. J. Yeley 1	Danny Glad 4 William Tatum Jr. 2 Paul Clapprood 1 John Reaume 7 R. B. Bracken 4 Dalton Blackburn 1 Bruce Cook 3 Doug George 1
Chevrolet 15 Toyota 8	Reaume Brothers Racing	33	Robby Lyons (R) 2 (Note: Entries were fielded in a collaboration with Chad Finley Racing.)	Danny Glad 4 William Tatum Jr. 2 Paul Clapprood 1 John Reaume 7 R. B. Bracken 4 Dalton Blackburn 1 Bruce Cook 3 Doug George 1
Chevrolet 15 Toyota 8	Reaume Brothers Racing	33	Chad Finley 1	Danny Glad 4 William Tatum Jr. 2 Paul Clapprood 1 John Reaume 7 R. B. Bracken 4 Dalton Blackburn 1 Bruce Cook 3 Doug George 1

=== Limited schedule ===
Manufacturer	Team	No.	Race driver	Crew chief	Rounds
Chevrolet	Beaver Motorsports	50	Travis Kvapil	Rob Winfield 2 Amanda Beaver 12; Clinton Cram 1 David McClure 1 Tim Goulet 1 Matthew Kempf 1	2
Chevrolet	Beaver Motorsports	50	B. J. McLeod	Rob Winfield 2 Amanda Beaver 12; Clinton Cram 1 David McClure 1 Tim Goulet 1 Matthew Kempf 1	1
Chevrolet	Beaver Motorsports	50	Dawson Cram	Rob Winfield 2 Amanda Beaver 12; Clinton Cram 1 David McClure 1 Tim Goulet 1 Matthew Kempf 1	1
Chevrolet	Beaver Motorsports	50	Todd Peck	Rob Winfield 2 Amanda Beaver 12; Clinton Cram 1 David McClure 1 Tim Goulet 1 Matthew Kempf 1	2
Chevrolet	Beaver Motorsports	50	Jamie Mosley	Rob Winfield 2 Amanda Beaver 12; Clinton Cram 1 David McClure 1 Tim Goulet 1 Matthew Kempf 1	1
Chevrolet	Beaver Motorsports	50	Timmy Hill	Rob Winfield 2 Amanda Beaver 12; Clinton Cram 1 David McClure 1 Tim Goulet 1 Matthew Kempf 1	2
Chevrolet	Beaver Motorsports	50	Ross Chastain (Note: Entries were fielded in a collaboration with Premium Motorsports.)	Rob Winfield 2 Amanda Beaver 12; Clinton Cram 1 David McClure 1 Tim Goulet 1 Matthew Kempf 1	2
Chevrolet	Beaver Motorsports	50	Brian Kaltreider	Rob Winfield 2 Amanda Beaver 12; Clinton Cram 1 David McClure 1 Tim Goulet 1 Matthew Kempf 1	1
Chevrolet	Beaver Motorsports	50	Mike Harmon	Rob Winfield 2 Amanda Beaver 12; Clinton Cram 1 David McClure 1 Tim Goulet 1 Matthew Kempf 1	1
Chevrolet	Beaver Motorsports	50	Ray Ciccarelli	Rob Winfield 2 Amanda Beaver 12; Clinton Cram 1 David McClure 1 Tim Goulet 1 Matthew Kempf 1	2
Chevrolet	Beaver Motorsports	50	Reed Sorenson	Rob Winfield 2 Amanda Beaver 12; Clinton Cram 1 David McClure 1 Tim Goulet 1 Matthew Kempf 1	1
Chevrolet	Beaver Motorsports	50	Gray Gaulding	Rob Winfield 2 Amanda Beaver 12; Clinton Cram 1 David McClure 1 Tim Goulet 1 Matthew Kempf 1	1
Chevrolet	Beaver Motorsports	50	Camden Murphy	Rob Winfield 2 Amanda Beaver 12; Clinton Cram 1 David McClure 1 Tim Goulet 1 Matthew Kempf 1	1
Chevrolet	Bobby Gerhart Racing	63	Bobby Gerhart (Note: Entries were fielded in a collaboration with MB Motorsports.)	Robbie Freeman 11; Rick Ren 2 Doug George 3 Brian Keselowski 1 Bryan Berry 1	2
Chevrolet	MB Motorsports 5 (Note: MB Motorsports and Copp Motorsports shared the Nos. 36/63/83 and helped each other at the track in all their entries.); Copp Motorsports 11	63	Akinori Ogata	Robbie Freeman 11; Rick Ren 2 Doug George 3 Brian Keselowski 1 Bryan Berry 1	1
Chevrolet	MB Motorsports 5 Copp Motorsports 11	63	Scott Stenzel	Robbie Freeman 11; Rick Ren 2 Doug George 3 Brian Keselowski 1 Bryan Berry 1	1
Chevrolet	MB Motorsports 5 Copp Motorsports 11	63	Kevin Donahue	Robbie Freeman 11; Rick Ren 2 Doug George 3 Brian Keselowski 1 Bryan Berry 1	3
Chevrolet	MB Motorsports 5 Copp Motorsports 11	63	Camden Murphy	Robbie Freeman 11; Rick Ren 2 Doug George 3 Brian Keselowski 1 Bryan Berry 1	1
Chevrolet	MB Motorsports 5 Copp Motorsports 11	63	J. J. Yeley	Robbie Freeman 11; Rick Ren 2 Doug George 3 Brian Keselowski 1 Bryan Berry 1	3
Chevrolet	MB Motorsports 5 Copp Motorsports 11	63	Kyle Donahue	Robbie Freeman 11; Rick Ren 2 Doug George 3 Brian Keselowski 1 Bryan Berry 1	2
Chevrolet	MB Motorsports 5 Copp Motorsports 11	63	Bayley Currey	Robbie Freeman 11; Rick Ren 2 Doug George 3 Brian Keselowski 1 Bryan Berry 1	2
Chevrolet	MB Motorsports 5 Copp Motorsports 11	63	Kyle Strickler	Robbie Freeman 11; Rick Ren 2 Doug George 3 Brian Keselowski 1 Bryan Berry 1	1
Chevrolet	MB Motorsports 5 Copp Motorsports 11	63	Timmy Hill	Robbie Freeman 11; Rick Ren 2 Doug George 3 Brian Keselowski 1 Bryan Berry 1	1
Chevrolet	MB Motorsports 5 Copp Motorsports 11	63	Jesse Iwuji	Robbie Freeman 11; Rick Ren 2 Doug George 3 Brian Keselowski 1 Bryan Berry 1	1
Chevrolet	Chad Finley Racing	42	Chad Finley	Bruce Cook	2
Chevrolet	Clay Greenfield Motorsports	68	Clay Greenfield	Danny Gill 3 Melvin Burns Jr. 1 Gary Mann 1	5
Chevrolet	Copp Motorsports	36	Bayley Currey	Robbie Freeman	1
Chevrolet	Copp Motorsports 19; MB Motorsports 3	83	Scott Stenzel	Jerry Kennedy 12; Doug George 1 Keith Wolfe 2 Jon Pittman 1 Robbie Freeman 4 Bryan Berry 1 Clinton Cram 1	2
Chevrolet	Copp Motorsports 19; MB Motorsports 3	83	Bayley Currey	Jerry Kennedy 12; Doug George 1 Keith Wolfe 2 Jon Pittman 1 Robbie Freeman 4 Bryan Berry 1 Clinton Cram 1	10
Chevrolet	Copp Motorsports 19; MB Motorsports 3	83	Kyle Donahue	Jerry Kennedy 12; Doug George 1 Keith Wolfe 2 Jon Pittman 1 Robbie Freeman 4 Bryan Berry 1 Clinton Cram 1	2
Chevrolet	Copp Motorsports 19; MB Motorsports 3	83	Tyler Matthews (Note: At Kentucky (race 12), the entry was fielded in a collaboration with NextGen Motorsports.)	Jerry Kennedy 12; Doug George 1 Keith Wolfe 2 Jon Pittman 1 Robbie Freeman 4 Bryan Berry 1 Clinton Cram 1	2
Chevrolet	Copp Motorsports 19; MB Motorsports 3	83	Nick Hoffman	Jerry Kennedy 12; Doug George 1 Keith Wolfe 2 Jon Pittman 1 Robbie Freeman 4 Bryan Berry 1 Clinton Cram 1	1
Chevrolet	Copp Motorsports 19; MB Motorsports 3	83	Todd Peck	Jerry Kennedy 12; Doug George 1 Keith Wolfe 2 Jon Pittman 1 Robbie Freeman 4 Bryan Berry 1 Clinton Cram 1	2
Chevrolet	Copp Motorsports 19; MB Motorsports 3	83	Joey Gase	Jerry Kennedy 12; Doug George 1 Keith Wolfe 2 Jon Pittman 1 Robbie Freeman 4 Bryan Berry 1 Clinton Cram 1	1
Chevrolet	Copp Motorsports 19; MB Motorsports 3	83	Dawson Cram	Jerry Kennedy 12; Doug George 1 Keith Wolfe 2 Jon Pittman 1 Robbie Freeman 4 Bryan Berry 1 Clinton Cram 1	2
Chevrolet	FDNY Racing	28	Bryan Dauzat	Jim Rosenblum	2
Chevrolet	Glenden Enterprises	47	Chris Fontaine	Kevin Ingram	2
Chevrolet	GMS Racing	23	Timothy Peters	Chad Norris	1
Chevrolet	Henderson Motorsports	75	Parker Kligerman	Chris Carrier	8
Chevrolet	Jennifer Jo Cobb Racing	0	Joey Gase	Joe Cobb 3 Brian Lear 10; Camden Murphy 1 Joe Lax 2	2
Chevrolet	Jennifer Jo Cobb Racing	0	Mike Senica	Joe Cobb 3 Brian Lear 10; Camden Murphy 1 Joe Lax 2	1
Chevrolet	Jennifer Jo Cobb Racing	0	Camden Murphy	Joe Cobb 3 Brian Lear 10; Camden Murphy 1 Joe Lax 2	8
Chevrolet	Jennifer Jo Cobb Racing	0	Ray Ciccarelli (Note: At Talladega (race 19) and Homestead (race 23), the entry was fielded in a collaboration with CMI Motorsports.)	Joe Cobb 3 Brian Lear 10; Camden Murphy 1 Joe Lax 2	4
Chevrolet	Jennifer Jo Cobb Racing	0	Justin Kunz	Joe Cobb 3 Brian Lear 10; Camden Murphy 1 Joe Lax 2	1
Chevrolet	Jordan Anderson Racing	97	Roger Reuse (Note: Entry was fielded by Jordan Anderson Racing in a collaboration with JJL Motorsports.)	Steve Szabo	1
Chevrolet	MDM Motorsports	99	Tyler Matthews	Shane Huffman 1 Jeff Stankiewicz 3	1
Chevrolet	MDM Motorsports	99	Sheldon Creed	Shane Huffman 1 Jeff Stankiewicz 3	1
Chevrolet	MDM Motorsports	99	Chase Purdy	Shane Huffman 1 Jeff Stankiewicz 3	2
Chevrolet	Mike Affarano Motorsports	03	John Provenzano	David McClure	1
Chevrolet	Mike Harmon Racing	74	Cody Ware	Tim Goulet 10; Jason Houghtaling 2 Alan Collins Jr. 1 Barbara Hein 1	1
Chevrolet	Mike Harmon Racing	74	Tim Viens	Tim Goulet 10; Jason Houghtaling 2 Alan Collins Jr. 1 Barbara Hein 1	1
Chevrolet	Mike Harmon Racing	74	Mike Harmon	Tim Goulet 10; Jason Houghtaling 2 Alan Collins Jr. 1 Barbara Hein 1	8
Chevrolet	Mike Harmon Racing	74	Bryant Barnhill	Tim Goulet 10; Jason Houghtaling 2 Alan Collins Jr. 1 Barbara Hein 1	1
Chevrolet	Mike Harmon Racing	74	B. J. McLeod	Tim Goulet 10; Jason Houghtaling 2 Alan Collins Jr. 1 Barbara Hein 1	2
Chevrolet	Mike Harmon Racing	74	Trevor Collins	Tim Goulet 10; Jason Houghtaling 2 Alan Collins Jr. 1 Barbara Hein 1	1
Chevrolet	NEMCO Motorsports	87	Joe Nemechek	Jim Mazza 1 Duke Whiseant 14	13
Chevrolet	NEMCO Motorsports	87	Timmy Hill	Jim Mazza 1 Duke Whiseant 14	2
Chevrolet	Niece Motorsports	38	Max McLaughlin	Ron Paradiso 1 Cody Efaw 6	1
Chevrolet	Niece Motorsports	38	Ross Chastain	Ron Paradiso 1 Cody Efaw 6	3
Chevrolet	Niece Motorsports	38	T. J. Bell	Ron Paradiso 1 Cody Efaw 6	1
Chevrolet	Niece Motorsports	38	Landon Huffman	Ron Paradiso 1 Cody Efaw 6	2
Chevrolet	Norm Benning Racing	6	Norm Benning	Angelo Calabrese 17; Brian Poff 3	20
Chevrolet	Norm Benning Racing	57	Jeff Zillweger	Dan Sheffer	1
Chevrolet	Reaume Brothers Racing	34	Jeffrey Abbey	Rob Winfield 2 John Reaume 2	1
Chevrolet	Reaume Brothers Racing	34	J. J. Yeley	Rob Winfield 2 John Reaume 2	1
Chevrolet	Reaume Brothers Racing	34	B. J. McLeod	Rob Winfield 2 John Reaume 2	1
Chevrolet	Reaume Brothers Racing	34	Jesse Iwuji	Rob Winfield 2 John Reaume 2	1
Chevrolet	TJL Motorsports	1	B. J. McLeod	Teddy Brown 2 Jacob Kramer 1 William Guinade 1 Mark Beaver 1	1
Chevrolet	TJL Motorsports	1	Clay Greenfield	Teddy Brown 2 Jacob Kramer 1 William Guinade 1 Mark Beaver 1	1
Chevrolet	TJL Motorsports	1	Tommy Regan	Teddy Brown 2 Jacob Kramer 1 William Guinade 1 Mark Beaver 1	1
Chevrolet	TJL Motorsports	1	Mike Senica	Teddy Brown 2 Jacob Kramer 1 William Guinade 1 Mark Beaver 1	1
Chevrolet	TJL Motorsports	1	Camden Murphy	Teddy Brown 2 Jacob Kramer 1 William Guinade 1 Mark Beaver 1	1
Chevrolet	Young's Motorsports	12	Reid Wilson	Steven Dawson 1 Buddy Sisco 4 Bruce Cook 1	1
Chevrolet	Young's Motorsports	12	Ty Dillon	Steven Dawson 1 Buddy Sisco 4 Bruce Cook 1	1
Chevrolet	Young's Motorsports	12	Alex Tagliani	Steven Dawson 1 Buddy Sisco 4 Bruce Cook 1	1
Chevrolet	Young's Motorsports	12	Tate Fogleman	Steven Dawson 1 Buddy Sisco 4 Bruce Cook 1	1
Chevrolet	Young's Motorsports	12	Tanner Thorson	Steven Dawson 1 Buddy Sisco 4 Bruce Cook 1	1
Chevrolet	Young's Motorsports	12	Tyler Young	Steven Dawson 1 Buddy Sisco 4 Bruce Cook 1	1
Ford	Jacob Wallace Racing	80	Justin Shipley	Tracy Wallace	1
Ford	JJL Motorsports	97	Jesse Little	Matt Noyce	9
Ford	JJL Motorsports	97	R. J. Otto Jr.	Matt Noyce	1
Ford	RBR Enterprises	92	Timothy Peters	Michael Hester	3
Ford	Roper Racing	04	Cory Roper	Craig Roper 1 Shane Whitbeck 5	6
Ford	ThorSport Racing	27	Chase Briscoe	Bud Haefele	1
Toyota	All Out Motorsports	7	Korbin Forrister	Doug George	11
Toyota	All Out Motorsports	7	Reid Wilson	Doug George	1
Toyota	Bill McAnally Racing	19	Derek Kraus	Ty Joiner	1
Toyota	DGR-Crosley	17	Bo LeMastus (R)	Chris Lawson 5 Kevin Manion 3 Seth Smith 1	4
Toyota	DGR-Crosley	17	Chris Eggleston	Chris Lawson 5 Kevin Manion 3 Seth Smith 1	1
Toyota	DGR-Crosley	17	Tyler Dippel	Chris Lawson 5 Kevin Manion 3 Seth Smith 1	1
Toyota	DGR-Crosley	17	Kyle Benjamin	Chris Lawson 5 Kevin Manion 3 Seth Smith 1	1
Toyota	DGR-Crosley	17	David Gilliland	Chris Lawson 5 Kevin Manion 3 Seth Smith 1	1
Toyota	DGR-Crosley	17	Tyler Ankrum	Chris Lawson 5 Kevin Manion 3 Seth Smith 1	1
Toyota	Kyle Busch Motorsports	46	Brandon Jones	Cody Glick	1
Toyota	Kyle Busch Motorsports	46	Christian Eckes	Cody Glick	4
Toyota	Kyle Busch Motorsports	46	Riley Herbst	Cody Glick	1
Toyota	NextGen Motorsports	35	Brennan Poole	Ryan Bell 1 Teddy Brown 1	2
Toyota	On Point Motorsports	30	Scott Lagasse Jr.	Steven Lane	2
Toyota	On Point Motorsports	30	Austin Theriault	Steven Lane	1
Toyota	On Point Motorsports	30	Jeb Burton	Steven Lane	2
Chevrolet 1 Ford 1	Grant County Mulch Racing	9	Codie Rohrbaugh	Garrett Lambert 1 Michael Shelton 1	2

=== Changes ===
==== Drivers ====
- On October 30, 2017, it was announced that Austin Wayne Self would drive full-time for Niece Motorsports. Self had driven part-time for multiple teams including Niece, AM Racing and Martins Motorsports in 2017. On December 12, 2017, it was announced that Justin Fontaine would drive a second truck, numbered 45, alongside Self. Niece also formed a technical alliance with GMS Racing.
- On November 10, 2017, it was announced that Austin Hill would run the full season for Young's Motorsports in the No. 02. He had run part-time for the team in 2017.
- On February 7, it was announced that Brett Moffitt would drive full-time for Hattori Racing Enterprises in the team's No. 16 truck, replacing Ryan Truex. Moffitt had driven part-time in the Truck Series with Red Horse Racing in 2017. He had also previously driven for HRE in the NASCAR K&N Pro Series East.
- On January 8, 2018, it was announced that Harrison Burton would be driving 9 races for Kyle Busch Motorsports in the No. 51 Toyota Tundra. Burton will be in the truck at Martinsville in the spring and fall, Dover, Iowa, Bristol, Canadian Tire Motorsport Park, Texas in the fall, ISM Raceway in Phoenix, and Homestead-Miami. On January 11, it was announced that team owner Kyle Busch will drive the No. 51 truck in three races: Las Vegas in the spring, Charlotte, and Pocono. On January 23, it was announced that JGR NASCAR Xfinity Series driver Brandon Jones, as well as NASCAR Next alum Spencer Davis and Riley Herbst, would drive the No. 51 for most of the rest of the season, with Jones and Herbst also making one start apiece in the team's No. 46 entry.
- On January 17, 2018, it was announced that Todd Gilliland will drive the No. 4 truck full-time effective May 15, when he reaches the minimum age for full-time drivers (18). Gilliland will drive in both age-eligible races at Martinsville and Dover prior to his birthday. In 2017, Gilliland drove full-time in both the NASCAR K&N Pro Series East and West, driving the No. 16 Toyota Camry for Bill McAnally Racing and winning the West series championship. Gilliland also made Truck starts for Kyle Busch Motorsports, driving the No. 46 and No. 51 Toyota Tundras at age-eligible races in the previous season.
- On January 12, 2018, it was announced that Dalton Sargeant would be racing full-time for GMS Racing driving the No. 25 Chevrolet Silverado. Sargeant will also compete for Rookie of the Year honors. In 2017, Sargeant drove full-time in the ARCA Racing Series, driving the No. 77 Ford Fusion for Cunningham Motorsports. Sargeant also made a few starts in the Truck Series, driving the No. 99 MDM Motorsports Chevrolet Silverado.
- On January 16, 2018, it was announced that Cody Coughlin would be joining GMS Racing in 2018, driving the No. 2 Chevrolet Silverado. In 2017, Coughlin drove the No. 13 Toyota Tundra for ThorSport Racing.
- On January 23, 2018, it was announced that Robby Lyons would run the full season for Premium Motorsports in 2018 in the No. 15 Chevrolet. Lyons previously drove a two races for Premium in 2017, driving the organization's No. 49 entry. It was later announced prior to the spring Dover race that Lyons's sponsorship deal fell through, and he would be replaced by part-time Premium Motorsports Cup Series driver Ross Chastain. Lyons would return to the truck at Kansas.
- On January 25, 2018, it was announced that Chris Eggleston would drive a partial schedule for the new David Gilliland Racing-Crosley Sports Group team. Eggleston had last run in the Truck Series in 2014.
- On January 31, 2018, it was announced that Jordan Anderson would run his own team for the 2018 season with support from Niece Motorsports. He will drive a Toyota Tundra for the restrictor plate tracks and alternate other manufacturers throughout the season.
- On February 2, 2018, it was announced that Max McLaughlin, son of longtime Busch Series driver Mike McLaughlin, had signed a driver development contract with Niece Motorsports, and will run at least four races for the team in 2018. He will make his debut at Eldora.
- On February 7, 2018, it was announced that Myatt Snider would be joining ThorSport Racing in 2018, driving the No.13 Ford F-150. Last year Snider drove the No. 51 Kyle Busch Motorsports Toyota Tundra part-time.

==== Teams ====
- On August 17, 2017, Brad Keselowski announced the shutdown of Brad Keselowski Racing after the 2017 season.
- On December 30, 2017, Martins Motorsports announced the closure of the team. Team owner Tommy Joe Martins stated that deals with other drivers to drive the truck had fallen through, and that he is driving a partial Xfinity Series schedule with B. J. McLeod Motorsports in 2018.
- On January 22, 2018, David Gilliland Racing and Crosley Sports Group announced a merger of their teams which includes an expansion to a single truck driver development team in the Camping World Truck Series with support from Toyota Racing Development and an alliance with Kyle Busch Motorsports. These teams will continue to field cars in late models, the K&N Pro Series, and the ARCA racing series. Bo LeMastus will drive the No. 54 Toyota.
- Young's Motorsports formed an alliance with Team Dillon to put Team Dillon drivers in a second Young's truck, the No. 20. The No. 20 ran part-time in 2017 but will run the length of the schedule in 2018.

==== Manufacturers ====
- On January 16, 2018, it was announced that, after a six-year relationship, ThorSport Racing split ways with Toyota. On January 22, 2018, Ford was announced to be the new manufacturer for the team.

==== Engine rules ====
- Teams may use an Ilmor-built LSX 396 engine, similar to the ARCA Racing Series, in 2018, regardless of manufacturer of the body.

== Schedule ==
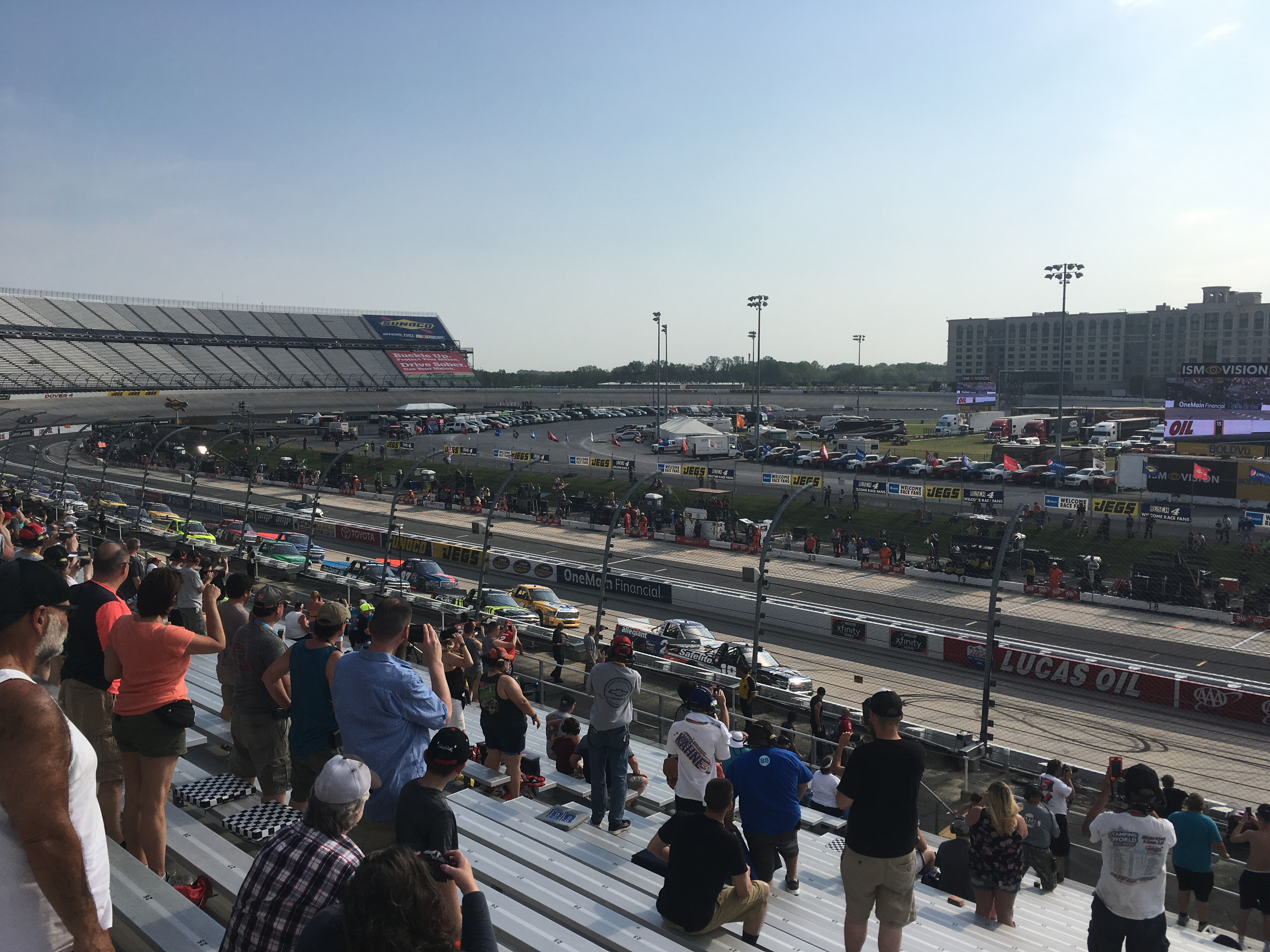
The JEGS 200 at Dover International Speedway in May

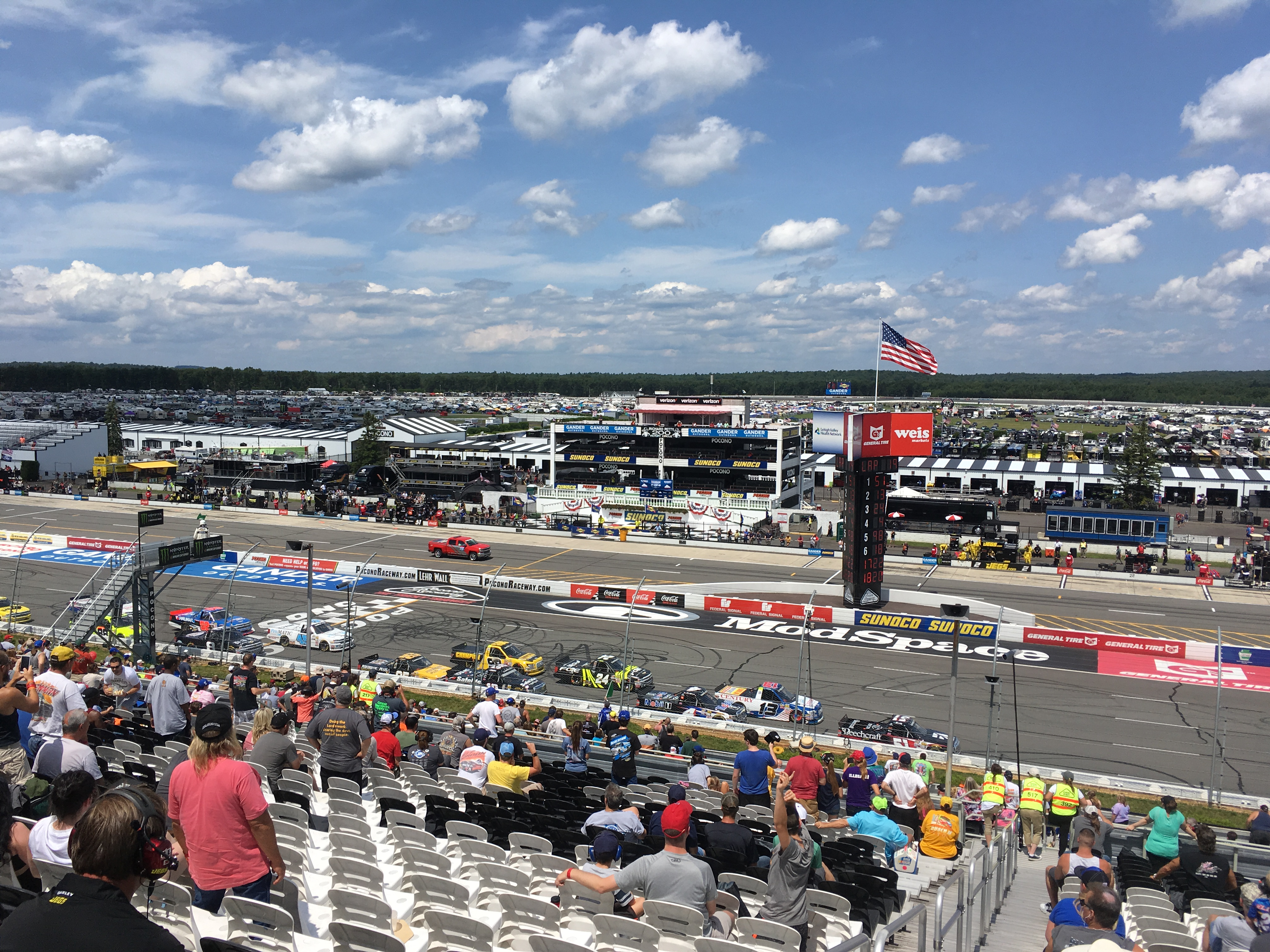
The Gander Outdoors 150 at Pocono Raceway in July

The final schedule – comprising 23 races – was released on May 23, 2017.

No	Race title	Track	Location	Date	TV
1	NextEra Energy Resources 250	Daytona International Speedway	Daytona Beach, Florida	February 16	FS1
2	Active Pest Control 200	Atlanta Motor Speedway	Hampton, Georgia	February 24	FS1
3	Stratosphere 200	Las Vegas Motor Speedway	Las Vegas, Nevada	March 2	FS1
4	Alpha Energy Solutions 250	Martinsville Speedway	Ridgeway, Virginia	March 24/26 (Note: Race started on Saturday, March 24 but stopped after 23 laps and remainder postponed to Monday, March 26 due to weather.)	FS1
5	JEGS 200	Dover International Speedway	Dover, Delaware	May 4	FS1
6	37 Kind Days 250	Kansas Speedway	Kansas City, Kansas	May 11	FS1
7	North Carolina Education Lottery 200	Charlotte Motor Speedway	Concord, North Carolina	May 18	FS1
8	PPG 400	Texas Motor Speedway	Fort Worth, Texas	June 8	FS1
9	M&M's 200	Iowa Speedway	Newton, Iowa	June 16	FS1
10	Eaton 200	Gateway Motorsports Park	Madison, Illinois	June 23	FS1
11	Overton's 225	Chicagoland Speedway	Joliet, Illinois	June 29	FS1
12	Buckle Up in Your Truck 225	Kentucky Speedway	Sparta, Kentucky	July 12	FS1
13	Eldora Dirt Derby	Eldora Speedway	Allen Township, Darke County, Ohio	July 18	FS1
14	Gander Outdoors 150	Pocono Raceway	Long Pond, Pennsylvania	July 28	FS1
15	Corrigan Oil 200	Michigan International Speedway	Cambridge Township, Michigan	August 11	FS1
16	UNOH 200	Bristol Motor Speedway	Bristol, Tennessee	August 16	Fox
NASCAR Camping World Truck Series Playoffs
Round of 8
17	Chevrolet Silverado 250	Canadian Tire Motorsport Park	Clarington, Ontario, Canada	August 26	FS1
18	World of Westgate 200	Las Vegas Motor Speedway	Las Vegas, Nevada	September 14	FS1
19	Fr8Auctions 250	Talladega Superspeedway	Lincoln, Alabama	October 13	Fox
Round of 6
20	Texas Roadhouse 200	Martinsville Speedway	Ridgeway, Virginia	October 27	FS1
21	JAG Metals 350	Texas Motor Speedway	Fort Worth, Texas	November 2	FS1
22	Lucas Oil 150	ISM Raceway	Avondale, Arizona	November 9	FS1
Championship 4
23	Ford EcoBoost 200	Homestead–Miami Speedway	Homestead, Florida	November 16	FS1

=== Schedule changes ===
In 2015, NASCAR and 21 Camping World Truck Series tracks agreed on a five-year contract that guarantees each track would continue to host races through 2020. Despite the agreement, Speedway Motorsports decided to cancel the New Hampshire Motor Speedway race and add a second race at Las Vegas Motor Speedway, to form two weekends involving each of the three national series. The new race will be the third race of the regular season, while the established fall race will be the second race of the first playoff round.

As a result, the Chevrolet Silverado 250 at Canadian Tire Motorsport Park will be held as the first race of the playoffs, while the Overton's 225 at Chicagoland Speedway will move from September to June. The UNOH 200 at Bristol Motor Speedway will become the final race of the regular season as a result of the schedule realignment.

Unlike the 2017 schedule, the JEGS 200 at Dover International Speedway will precede the 37 Kind Days 250 at Kansas Speedway and the North Carolina Education Lottery 200 at Charlotte Motor Speedway. Also, the Eaton 200 at Gateway Motorsports Park will be held one week later as the tenth race of the season, slated to be held the week before the Chicagoland round.

On April 17, 2018, Bristol Motor Speedway announced the UNOH 200 will be moved one day to Thursday night, August 16. The new race date will also reflect a change from FS1 to Fox, as the race broadcast moves to the broadcast network. The live Thursday night race on Fox coincides with preparation for Fox to broadcast the majority of Thursday games during the 2018 NFL season. Fox will now air two Truck Series races, both during the second half of the season when NBC has the Monster Energy NASCAR Cup and Xfinity Series coverage.

== Results and standings ==
=== Race results ===
No.	Race	Pole position	Most laps led	Winning driver	Manufacturer	No.	Winning team
1	NextEra Energy Resources 250	David Gilliland	Johnny Sauter	Johnny Sauter	Chevrolet	21	GMS Racing
2	Active Pest Control 200	Kyle Busch	Kyle Busch	Brett Moffitt	Toyota	16	Hattori Racing Enterprises
3	Stratosphere 200	Kyle Busch	Kyle Busch	Kyle Busch	Toyota	51	Kyle Busch Motorsports
4	Alpha Energy Solutions 250	Ben Rhodes	Ben Rhodes	John Hunter Nemechek	Chevrolet	8	NEMCO Motorsports
5	JEGS 200	Noah Gragson	Johnny Sauter	Johnny Sauter	Chevrolet	21	GMS Racing
6	37 Kind Days 250	Noah Gragson	Noah Gragson	Noah Gragson	Toyota	18	Kyle Busch Motorsports
7	North Carolina Education Lottery 200	Johnny Sauter	Johnny Sauter	Johnny Sauter	Chevrolet	21	GMS Racing
8	PPG 400	Stewart Friesen	Todd Gilliland	Johnny Sauter	Chevrolet	21	GMS Racing
9	M&M's 200	Harrison Burton	Brett Moffitt	Brett Moffitt	Toyota	16	Hattori Racing Enterprises
10	Eaton 200	Grant Enfinger	Noah Gragson	Justin Haley	Chevrolet	24	GMS Racing
11	Overton's 225	Noah Gragson	John Hunter Nemechek	Brett Moffitt	Toyota	16	Hattori Racing Enterprises
12	Buckle Up in Your Truck 225	Noah Gragson	Noah Gragson	Ben Rhodes	Ford	41	ThorSport Racing
13	Eldora Dirt Derby	Ben Rhodes	Chase Briscoe	Chase Briscoe	Ford	27	ThorSport Racing
14	Gander Outdoors 150	Kyle Busch	Kyle Busch	Kyle Busch	Toyota	51	Kyle Busch Motorsports
15	Corrigan Oil 200	John Hunter Nemechek	Matt Crafton; Noah Gragson	Brett Moffitt	Toyota	16	Hattori Racing Enterprises
16	UNOH 200	Christopher Bell	John Hunter Nemechek	Johnny Sauter	Chevrolet	21	GMS Racing
NASCAR Camping World Truck Series Playoffs
Round of 8
17	Chevrolet Silverado 250	Ben Rhodes	Noah Gragson	Justin Haley	Chevrolet	24	GMS Racing
18	World of Westgate 200	Noah Gragson	Grant Enfinger	Grant Enfinger	Ford	98	ThorSport Racing
19	Fr8Auctions 250	David Gilliland	Grant Enfinger	Timothy Peters	Chevrolet	25	GMS Racing
Round of 6
20	Texas Roadhouse 200	Todd Gilliland	Johnny Sauter	Johnny Sauter	Chevrolet	21	GMS Racing
21	JAG Metals 350	Johnny Sauter	Todd Gilliland	Justin Haley	Chevrolet	24	GMS Racing
22	Lucas Oil 150	Noah Gragson	Harrison Burton	Brett Moffitt	Toyota	16	Hattori Racing Enterprises
Championship 4
23	Ford EcoBoost 200	Grant Enfinger	Brett Moffitt	Brett Moffitt	Toyota	16	Hattori Racing Enterprises

=== Drivers' standings ===
(key) Bold – Pole position awarded by time. Italics – Pole position set by final practice results or owner's points. * – Most laps led. ^{1} – Stage 1 winner. ^{2} – Stage 2 winner. ^{1-10} – Regular season top 10 finishers.
. – Eliminated after Round of 8 . – Eliminated after Round of 6

Pos.	Driver	DAY	ATL	LVS	MAR	DOV	KAN	CLT	TEX	IOW	GTW	CHI	KEN	ELD	POC	MCH	BRI	MSP	LVS	TAL	MAR	TEX	PHO	HOM	Pts.	Stage	Bonus
1	Brett Moffitt	26	1	3	3	12	16	4^{1}	18	1*	14	1	18	5	26	1	18	3	11	17	2	3	1^{1}	1*^{2}	4040	–	39^{5}
2	Noah Gragson	23	2^{1}	12^{1}	5	**20**^{1}	**1***^{12}	8	10	2	10*	**4**^{2}	**8***^{2}	6	INQ	4*	9	9*^{12}	**18**^{1}	13	7	10	**2**	3	4034	–	25^{2}
3	Justin Haley	2	22	28	10	3	10	14	3	16	1	6	10	9	5	9	6	1	3	4	6	1^{1}	28	8	4029	–	20^{7}
4	Johnny Sauter	1*^{2}	3	2	19	1*^{2}	5	1*	1	5	3	3	15	16	8	2	1	6	2	22	1*^{12}	**11**	7	12	4025	–	49^{1}
NASCAR Camping World Truck Series Playoffs cut-off
Pos.	Driver	DAY	ATL	LVS	MAR	DOV	KAN	CLT	TEX	IOW	GTW	CHI	KEN	ELD	POC	MCH	BRI	MSP	LVS	TAL	MAR	TEX	PHO	HOM	Pts.	Stage	Bonus
5	Grant Enfinger	6	9	4	4	14	8	12	4^{2}	11	**21**^{1}	8	6	2	6	7^{2}	10	17	1*^{2}	19*^{1}	14	12	4	**2**^{1}	2284	44	19^{3}
6	Matt Crafton	19	5	29	15	2	6	11	5	26	20	11	3	4	9	10*	8	5	5	26	13	9	11	6	2280	53	3^{8}
7	Stewart Friesen	27	6	5^{2}	20	23	3	6	**2**^{1}	9^{2}	13	19	2	3	4^{2}	8^{1}	2	7	17	6	11	8	5	4	2265	52	12^{4}
8	Ben Rhodes	4	4	7	**12***^{12}	8	19	5	16	17	19	2	1^{1}	**29**^{1}	11	6	7	**14**	4	16	4	2	12	10	2254	43	14^{6}
9	Myatt Snider **(R)**	24	7	15	6	11	15	15	23	10	4	10	26	20	12	18	29	19	6	2	3	13^{2}	22	14	611	84	1^{9}
10	Todd Gilliland **(R)**				14	10		10	6*	29	2	16	7	22	7^{1}	5	5	11	27	20^{2}	**12**	4*	17	13	590	124	2
11	Austin Hill	11	18	10	9	31	12	18	13	14	11	9	16	21	13	19	21	8	23	10	20	5	30	21	520	29	–
12	Austin Wayne Self	20	15	16	27	15	13	27	17	15	16	13	14	18	18	11	13	21	9	12	23	16	19	23	480	20	–
13	Cody Coughlin	17	20	8	26	6	7	17	8	7	9	12	12	28	14	14	19	15	24						433	30	–
14	Dalton Sargeant **(R)**	8	14	6	11	13	11	19	11	19	30	20	9	27	3	12	11								404	36	0^{10}
15	Jordan Anderson	9	24	17	22	18	25	20	19	23	23	17	19		16	13	22	16	20	7	26	29	23	20	389	3	–
16	Justin Fontaine **(R)**	10	19	9	28	19	17	30	30	12	26	14	17	25	17	25	24	18	14	21	27	19	24	22	386	2	–
17	Wendell Chavous	12	23	14	18	17	27	22	12	21	15	22	24	23	21	16	23	24	28	5					336	–	–
18	Harrison Burton				8	5				**3**								13			8	6	3*^{2}	11	277	38	1
19	Jesse Little		8			9		16		6	7						26		15			7		9	275	45	–
20	Jennifer Jo Cobb	31	26	24	29	22	22	26	24	22	22	24	29	DNQ	22	23	DNQ	29	12	11	29	24	31	28	271	4	–
21	Joe Nemechek	3	12	31	Wth	7	30	Wth	15	31	32	28	DNQ		10	30		32	31	30		18	32	31	234	8	–
22	Norm Benning	14	29	26	31	27	23	31	21	20	24	31	25	32	25	21	DNQ	20	DNQ	DNQ	DNQ				193	–	–
23	Korbin Forrister	16	16			21		DNQ	22			18	13			24	27		13	15					188	3	–
24	Parker Kligerman	28	11			28		7					27				4			28	16				172	25	–
25	Tanner Thorson					16				13				19	15		14		32	31	31	21	18	29	172	4	–
26	Josh Reaume	DNQ	27	25	25	25	21	24	25	DNQ	18	21	23		19	20						DNQ			171	–	–
27	Bo LeMastus **(R)**	30	17				19	DNQ	26			15	20		20	17		22	30	29		32			168	1	–
28	Timothy Peters				7			DNQ									DNQ	4	19	1	10				161	13	–
29	David Gilliland	**21**^{1}				4				4										**3**		30			152	29	1
30	Spencer Davis	7	13	13					9							22									141	20	–
31	Bayley Currey			20		26	29	25	29	24		27	30		32	27	32		16			23			141	–	–
32	Robby Lyons **(R)**	13	25	18	24		26	23					22							14				27	140	–	–
33	Sheldon Creed													15							19	25	10	5	123	12	–
34	Tyler Dippel													13							17	14	14	15	122	10	–
35	Christian Eckes									8	28^{2}										9		9		110	18	1
36	Chris Eggleston							13	14				11						10						100	–	–
37	Cory Roper				13					18							25		25			28		17	96	–	–
38	Clay Greenfield	22	28						20				21				20			32					86	7	–
39	Riley Herbst										8						15		29				15		81	–	–
40	D. J. Kennington																	12			25		21	26	65	1	–
41	Kyle Donahue				23		20		28												22				55	–	–
42	Tyler Ankrum																				18		6		54	4	–
43	Dawson Cram				17																24		16		54	–	–
44	Chris Windom													14										24	49	13	–
45	Bryan Dauzat	18																		8					48	–	–
46	Logan Seavey													8											46	17	–
47	Tyler Young								7													27			45	5	–
48	Chad Finley										6						30				32				43	–	–
49	Brennan Poole																					15		19	43	3	–
50	Tate Fogleman										27		28			15			DNQ						41	–	–
51	Codie Rohrbaugh																16					17			41	–	–
52	Tyler Matthews				21						17		32												41	–	–
53	Chase Purdy																				21		13		40	–	–
54	Camden Murphy					29	DNQ		31	DNQ	DNQ	30	31		29	DNQ			Wth					32	40	–	–
55	Kevin Donahue				30		32				12														37	–	–
56	Reid Wilson				16					28												DNQ		30	37	–	–
57	Stefan Parsons																17						20		37	–	–
58	Todd Peck					32			32						23	26								Wth	35	–	–
59	Zane Smith										5														32	–	–
60	Scott Stenzel	15	32	32																					32	–	–
61	Ray Ciccarelli													DNQ	27			28		DNQ	DNQ			25	31	–	–
62	Derek Kraus																						8		30	1	–
63	Austin Theriault																		8						29	–	–
64	Nick Hoffman													10											27	–	–
65	Alex Tagliani																	10							27	–	–
66	Max McLaughlin													12											25	–	–
67	Jason White																	23					26		25	–	–
68	Jesse Iwuji																	25					27		22	–	–
69	Chris Fontaine	29																		24					21	–	–
70	Jeffrey Abbey													17											20	–	–
71	Michel Disdier			19																					18	–	–
72	Reed Sorenson					30^{†}			27^{†}						30^{†}	28^{†}						20			17	–	–
73	T. J. Bell																		21						16	–	–
74	Bobby Gerhart	DNQ																		23					14	–	–
75	J. R. Heffner													24											13	–	–
76	Landon Huffman																				DNQ		25		12	–	–
77	Bobby Reuse									25															12	–	–
78	Brian Kaltreider											25													12	–	–
79	Mike Senica			30	32																				12	–	–
80	Justin Shipley													26											11	–	–
81	Justin Kunz																	26							11	–	–
82	Tommy Regan			27																					10	–	–
83	Roger Reuse																	27							10	–	–
84	Jamie Mosley						28													DNQ					9	–	–
85	Brad Foy																				28				9	–	–
86	Bryant Barnhill									DNQ	31														6	–	–
87	Kyle Strickler													31											6	–	–
88	Travis Kvapil	32	DNQ																						5	–	–
	Braden Mitchell													DNQ											0	–	–
	Trevor Collins													DNQ											0	–	–
	R. J. Otto Jr.													DNQ											0	–	–
	John Provenzano													DNQ											0	–	–
	Jeff Zillweger				Wth																				0	–	–
Ineligible for Camping World Truck championship points
Pos.	Driver	DAY	ATL	LVS	MAR	DOV	KAN	CLT	TEX	IOW	GTW	CHI	KEN	ELD	POC	MCH	BRI	MSP	LVS	TAL	MAR	TEX	PHO	HOM	Pts.	Stage	Bonus
	Kyle Busch		**21***^{2}	**1***			2	2							**1***												
	John Hunter Nemechek	25		21	1		4	9^{2}		27^{1}	25	7*^{1}	5	7		**3**	3*^{12}	2	22	27	30		29	7			
	Chase Briscoe													1*^{2}													
	Kyle Benjamin				2																5						
	Erik Jones														2												
	Brandon Jones						9	3				5	4						26								
	Scott Lagasse Jr.	5															31			18							
	Ross Chastain									30	29	26					12		7			26		16			
	Max Tullman											23						29		9							
	Austin Dillon		10																								
	Justin Marks			11																							
	Ty Dillon													11													
	Bubba Wallace						14																				
	Jeb Burton																				15			18			
	Daniel Hemric							21																			
	Mike Harmon			22	DNQ	24	24	29	DNQ			32		DNQ				31				22					
	B. J. McLeod	DNQ		23							DNQ				24	29	DNQ										
	Spencer Gallagher																			25							
	Timmy Hill							28					DNQ		28	32						31					
	Christopher Bell																**28**										
	J. J. Yeley							32		32		29			31				DNQ								
	Akinori Ogata		30																								
	Ryan Newman													30													
	Joey Gase		31				31													DNQ							
	Matt Mills															31											
	Cody Ware	DNQ																									
	Tim Viens		DNQ																								
	Gray Gaulding																DNQ										
Pos.	Driver	DAY	ATL	LVS	MAR	DOV	KAN	CLT	TEX	IOW	GTW	CHI	KEN	ELD	POC	MCH	BRI	MSP	LVS	TAL	MAR	TEX	PHO	HOM	Pts.	Stage	Bonus
^{†} – Reed Sorenson started receiving points at Texas II.

=== Owners' championship (Top 15) ===
(key) Bold – Pole position awarded by time. Italics – Pole position set by final practice results or rainout. * – Most laps led. ^{1} – Stage 1 winner. ^{2} – Stage 2 winner. ^{1-10} – Owners' regular season top 10 finishers.
. – Eliminated after Round of 8 . – Eliminated after Round of 6

Pos.	No.	Car Owner	DAY	ATL	LVS	MAR	DOV	KAN	CLT	TEX	IOW	GTW	CHI	KEN	ELD	POC	MCH	BRI	MSP	LVS	TAL	MAR	TEX	PHO	HOM	Points	Bonus
1	16	Shigeaki Hattori	26	1	3	3	12	16	4^{1}	18	1*	14	1	18	5	26	1	18	3	11	17	2	3	1^{1}	1*^{2}	4040	38^{6}
2	18	Kyle Busch	23	2^{1}	12^{1}	5	**20**^{1}	**1***^{12}	8	10	2	10*	**4**^{2}	**8***^{2}	6	2	4*	9	9*^{12}	**18**^{1}	13	7	10	**2**	3	4034	25^{2}
3	24	Maurice J. Gallagher Jr.	2	22	28	10	3	10	14	3	16	1	6	10	9	5	9	6	1	3	4	6	1^{1}	28	8	4029	17^{10}
4	21	Maurice J. Gallagher Jr.	1*^{2}	3	2	19	1*^{2}	5	1*	1	5	3	3	15	16	8	2	1	6	2	22	1*^{12}	**11**	7	12	4025	49^{1}
NASCAR Camping World Truck Series Playoffs cut-off
5	98	Mike Curb	6	9	4	4	14	8	12	4^{2}	11	**21**^{1}	8	6	2	6	7^{2}	10	17	1*^{2}	19*^{1}	14	12	4	**2**^{1}	2266	19^{3}
6	41	Duke Thorson	4	4	7	**12***^{12}	8	19	5	16	17	19	2	1^{1}	**29**^{1}	11	6	7	**14**	4	16	4	2	12	10	2249	11^{9}
7	51	Kyle Busch	7	13	**1***	8	5	9	2	9	**3**	8	5	4	8	**1***	22	**28**	13	26	**3**	8	6	3*^{2}	11	2238	18^{4}
8	8	Joe Nemechek	25	12	21	1	7	4	9^{2}	15	27^{1}	25	7*^{1}	5	7	10	**3**	3*^{12}	2	22	27	30	18	29	7	2191	13^{8}
9	52	Chris Larsen	27	6	5^{2}	20	23	3	6	**2**^{1}	9^{2}	13	19	2	3	4^{2}	8^{1}	2	7	17	6	11	8	5	4	835	5
10	88	Rhonda Thorson	19	5	29	15	2	6	11	5	26	20	11	3	4	9	10*	8	5	5	26	13	9	11	6	803	–
11	4	Kyle Busch	**21**^{1}	**21***^{2}	13	14	10	2	10	6*	29	2	16	7	22	7^{1}	5	5	11	27	20^{2}	**12**	4*	17	13	744	4
12	13	Duke Thorson	24	7	15	6	11	15	15	23	10	4	10	26	20	12	18	29	19	6	2	3	13^{2}	22	14	611	1
13	25	Maurice J. Gallagher Jr.	8	14	6	11	13	11	19	11	19	30	20	9	27	3	12	11	4	19	1	17	14	14	15	593	5
14	2	Maurice J. Gallagher Jr.	17	20	8	26	6	7	17	8	7	9	12	12	28	14	14	19	15	24	8	19	25	10	5	546	–
15	02	Randy Young	11	18	10	9	31	12	18	13	14	11	9	16	21	13	19	21	8	23	10	20	5	30	21	520	–
Pos.	No.	Car Owner	DAY	ATL	LVS	MAR	DOV	KAN	CLT	TEX	IOW	GTW	CHI	KEN	ELD	POC	MCH	BRI	MSP	LVS	TAL	MAR	TEX	PHO	HOM	Points	Bonus

=== Manufacturers' Championship ===
Pos	Manufacturer	Wins	Points
1	Chevrolet	11	847
2	Toyota	9	822
3	Ford	3	776

== See also ==
- 2018 Monster Energy NASCAR Cup Series
- 2018 NASCAR Xfinity Series
- 2018 ARCA Racing Series
- 2018 NASCAR K&N Pro Series East
- 2018 NASCAR K&N Pro Series West
- 2018 NASCAR Whelen Modified Tour
- 2018 NASCAR Pinty's Series
- 2018 NASCAR PEAK Mexico Series
- 2018 NASCAR Whelen Euro Series
