= West Series races at Tucson =

ARCA Menards Series West races at Tucson Speedway

West Series race at Tucson Speedway
ARCA Menards Series West
- Venue: Tucson Speedway
- Location: Tucson, Arizona
- First race: 1993
- Distance: 56.25 mi (90.53 km)
- Laps: 150
- Previous names: Valvoline 200 (1993); Valvoline / Pit Lube 200 (1994 - Race 1); Winter Heat #2 (1994 - Race 2); Winter Heat 200 (1995 - Race 1); Valvoline / Checkers 200 (1995 - Race 2); NASCAR Winston West Series 150 (1996 - Race 1); Valvoline / Jiffly Lube 200 (1996 - Race 2); Winston West 150 (1997 - Race 1); The Exide NASCAR Select Batteries 200 (1997 - Race 2); Winston West 200 (1998-1999); Tucson 250 (2001); NAPA Auto Parts Wildcat 150 (2015–2016); NAPA Auto Parts Tucson 150 (2017); Port of Tucson Twin 100s (2018–2019); ARCA Menards Series West 150 presented by the West Coast Stock Car Motorsports Hall of Fame (2025); Tucson ARCA Menards West 150 (2026)
- Most wins (driver): Ron Hornaday Jr., Kody Vanderwal, Derek Kraus (2)
- Most wins (manufacturer): Ford (9)

Circuit information
- Surface: Asphalt
- Length: 0.375 mi (0.604 km)
- Turns: 4

The ARCA Menards Series West has held several races at Tucson Speedway in Tucson, Arizona many time including its return in 2025.

== Past winners ==
Year	Date	Driver	Manufacturer	Race distance		Race time	Average speed (mph)
Year	Date	Driver	Manufacturer	Laps	Miles	Race time	Average speed (mph)
1993	June 12	Dirk Stephens	Ford	200	75	1:09:05	65.139
1994	April 30	Mike Chase	Chevrolet	200	75	1:02:47	71.675
1994	November 27	Ron Hornaday Jr.	Chevrolet (2)	200	75	1:16:23	58.913
1995	January 22	Bill Sedgwick	Chevrolet (3)	200	75	1:20:29	55.912
1995	July 22	Doug George	Ford (2)	200	75	1:04:29	69.785
1996	January 21	Ron Hornaday Jr. (2)	Chevrolet (4)	150	56.250	0:51:34	65.44
1996	June 15	Mark Krogh	Chevrolet (5)	200	75	1:12:56	61.7
1997	January 19	Gary Collins	Chevrolet (6)	150	56.250	1:01:28	48.79
1997	May 10	Gary Smith	Chevrolet (7)	200	75	1:06:48	67.385
1998	January 11	Butch Gilliland	Ford (3)	200	75	1:14:35	60.335
1999	January 17	Sean Woodside	Chevrolet (8)	200	75	1:08:35	65.614
2000	Not held						
2001	March 10	Johnny Borneman III	Ford (4)	250	93.750	1:24:50	66.836
2002–2014	Not held						
2015	May 2	Noah Gragson	Ford (5)	150	56.250	1:00:05	58.419
2016	May 7	Ryan Partridge	Ford (6)	150	56.250	0:54:26	64.483
2017	March 18	Chris Eggleston	Toyota	150	56.250	1:01:26	54.938
2018	May 5	Kody Vanderwal	Ford (7)	100	37.5	0:31:14	72.038
2018	May 5	Kody Vanderwal (2)	Ford (8)	100	37.5	0:37:06	60.647
2019	May 11	Derek Kraus	Toyota (2)	100	37.5	0:36:59	60.838
2019	May 11	Derek Kraus (2)	Toyota (3)	100	37.5	0:38:17	58.772
2020–2024	Not held						
2025	April 5	Tanner Reif	Toyota (4)	150	56.250	0:47:02	71.758
2026	April 11	Cole Denton	Ford (9)	150	56.250	0:51:19	65.768
