= Todd Gilliland =

American racing driver (born 2000)

- Gilliland at Las Vegas Motor Speedway in 2026
- Born: Todd Jeremey Gilliland; May 15, 2000 (age 26); Sherrills Ford, North Carolina, U.S.
- Achievements: 2026 NASCAR In-Season Challenge Winner; 2016, 2017 NASCAR K&N Pro Series West Champion; 2016 Idaho 208 Winner; Records; Winner of the first ever CARS Late Model Stock Tour race (Southern National, 2015); Youngest ARCA Menards Series race winner (15 years, 2 days)

NASCAR Cup Series career
- 180 races run over 5 years
- Car no., team: No. 34 (Front Row Motorsports)
- 2026 position: 21st
- Best finish: 21st (2026)
- First race: 2022 Daytona 500 (Daytona)
- Last race: 2026 Season Finale 400 (Homestead)
Wins	Top tens	Poles
0	18	0

NASCAR FedEx Freight Truck Series career
- 94 races run over 6 years
- 2022 position: 89th
- Best finish: 7th (2021)
- First race: 2017 Bar Harbor 200 (Dover)
- Last race: 2022 Clean Harbors 150 (Knoxville)
- First win: 2019 NASCAR Hall of Fame 200 (Martinsville)
- Last win: 2022 Clean Harbors 150 (Knoxville)
Wins	Top tens	Poles
3	53	2

ARCA Menards Series career
- 9 races run over 3 years
- Best finish: 25th (2018)
- First race: 2015 Menards 200 presented by Federated Car Care (Toledo)
- Last race: 2019 FORTS USA 150 (Pocono)
- First win: 2015 Menards 200 presented by Federated Car Care (Toledo)
- Last win: 2019 General Tire 200 (Talladega)
Wins	Top tens	Poles
2	8	2

ARCA Menards Series East career
- 24 races run over 4 years
- Best finish: 2nd (2017)
- First race: 2016 Jet Tools 150 (New Smyrna)
- Last race: 2019 General Tire 125 (Dover)
- First win: 2016 Jet Tools 150 (New Smyrna)
- Last win: 2018 Zombie Auto 150 (Bristol)
Wins	Top tens	Poles
7	22	2

ARCA Menards Series West career
- 30 races run over 4 years
- Best finish: 1st (2016, 2017)
- First race: 2015 Casino Arizona 100 (Phoenix)
- Last race: 2020 Arizona Lottery 100 (Phoenix)
- First win: 2015 Casino Arizona 100 (Phoenix)
- Last win: 2017 Clint Newell Toyota 150 presented by NAPA Auto Parts (Douglas County)
Wins	Top tens	Poles
13	28	12
- Statistics up to date as of November 8, 2026.

Todd Jeremey Gilliland (born May 15, 2000) is an American professional stock car racing driver. He competes full-time in the NASCAR Cup Series, driving the No. 34 Ford Mustang Dark Horse SC for Front Row Motorsports. He is the son of NASCAR driver and Tricon Garage owner David Gilliland.

== Racing career ==
=== Early career ===
Gilliland first started driving when he was three years old; his parents purchased a pink (later repainted to black) Barbie Corvette with modified pedals and an additional battery to increase its speed. Afterwards, he began driving a quarter midget on a neighborhood dirt track. Two years later, he started racing competitively, but stopped for two years at the decision of his father. In 2012, he won championships in the North Carolina Quarter Midget Association, USAC World Formula National Quarter Midget Championship, and on the West Coast; he concluded his quarter midget career with 34 wins. The following year, he started limited late model racing, running three races. In 2014, he won his first limited late model race from the pole position at Ace Speedway. Later in the year, he won his first late model race at Southern National Motorsports Park.

=== ARCA (2015–2017) ===
==== ARCA Menards Series (2015) ====
On May 17, two days after his fifteenth birthday, Gilliland became the youngest driver to compete in the ARCA Racing Series when he made his debut at Toledo Speedway with Venturini Motorsports. After leading the race weekend's practice session and qualifying fifth, he held off Tom Hessert and Josh Williams to win, becoming the youngest winner in ARCA series history.

==== ARCA Menards Series East (2018) ====
Gilliland started the 2018 season by holding off Harrison Burton to win the K&N Pro Series East season opener at New Smyrna Speedway, leading the most laps and winning on a last lap pass. He also won the second K&N East race of the season, triumphing at Bristol Motor Speedway for his twentieth overall win in K&N Pro Series competition, also having won races in the NASCAR K&N Pro Series West.

==== ARCA Menards Series West (2015–2017) ====
===== 2015 =====
On November 12, 2015, Gilliland ran his first race in the K&N Pro Series West for Frontline Enterprises and Bill McAnally Racing at Phoenix International Raceway, taking the lead with five laps to go after J. J. Haley's tire went down and defeated William Byron on the green–white–checker finish to win. The win made Gilliland the youngest race winner in track history. In post-race inspection, Gilliland's car was found to have the lubrication oil reservoir tank cover bolted improperly. As a result, his team received a P5 penalty (the second-worst in NASCAR) and was docked thirty points, although Gilliland was allowed to keep the victory. On January 29, 2016, Gilliland joined Kyle Busch Motorsports' Super Late Model team.

===== 2016 =====
On February 4, 2016, McAnally announced that Gilliland would compete for full-time in the series, driving the No. 16 Toyota Camry. Gilliland also made a start in the K&N Pro Series East at New Smyrna Speedway. After winning the pole, he won the race in controversial fashion, as Ronnie Bassett Jr. was originally declared the winner since the flagman failed to wave the white flag in time after lap 150 and unintentionally extended the race by a lap. The race was subsequently declared official after 150 laps. On March 19, 2016, Gilliland went on to win his second Pro Series West race and his third Pro Touring series race at Irwindale Speedway. After winning at Kern County Raceway Park, the victory marked his fourth K&N Series win in four starts, tying the record set by Dan Gurney 50 years earlier. In May, he was named a member of the 2016–17 NASCAR Next program. Gilliland clinched the Pro Series West championship on October 15.

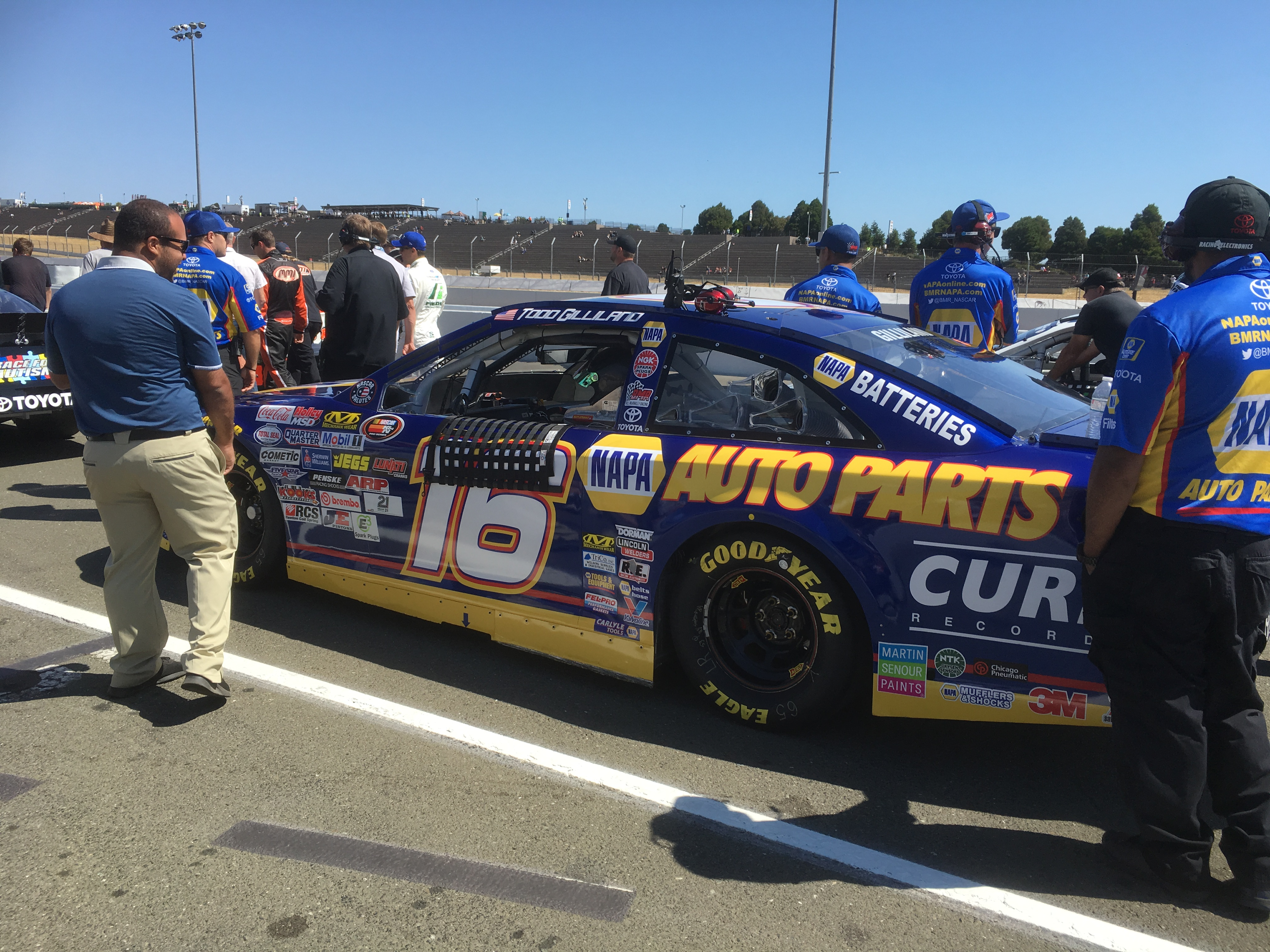
Gilliland's No. 16 at Sonoma Raceway in 2017

===== 2017 =====
On November 4, 2017, Gilliland won the Pro Series West championship for the second consecutive season.

=== NASCAR (2017–present) ===
==== NASCAR Craftsman Truck Series (2017–2021) ====
===== 2017 =====
In December 2016, Gilliland signed with Kyle Busch Motorsports to run four Camping World Truck Series races in the No. 51 Toyota Tundra in 2017. In May 2017, KBM announced plans for Gilliland to make his Truck Series debut at Dover International Speedway in the No. 46 truck, followed by stints in the No. 51 at Gateway Motorsports Park, Canadian Tire Motorsports Park and New Hampshire Motor Speedway before returning to the No. 46 at Martinsville Speedway. For his final Truck race of the year, he would drive the No. 51 at Phoenix International Raceway.

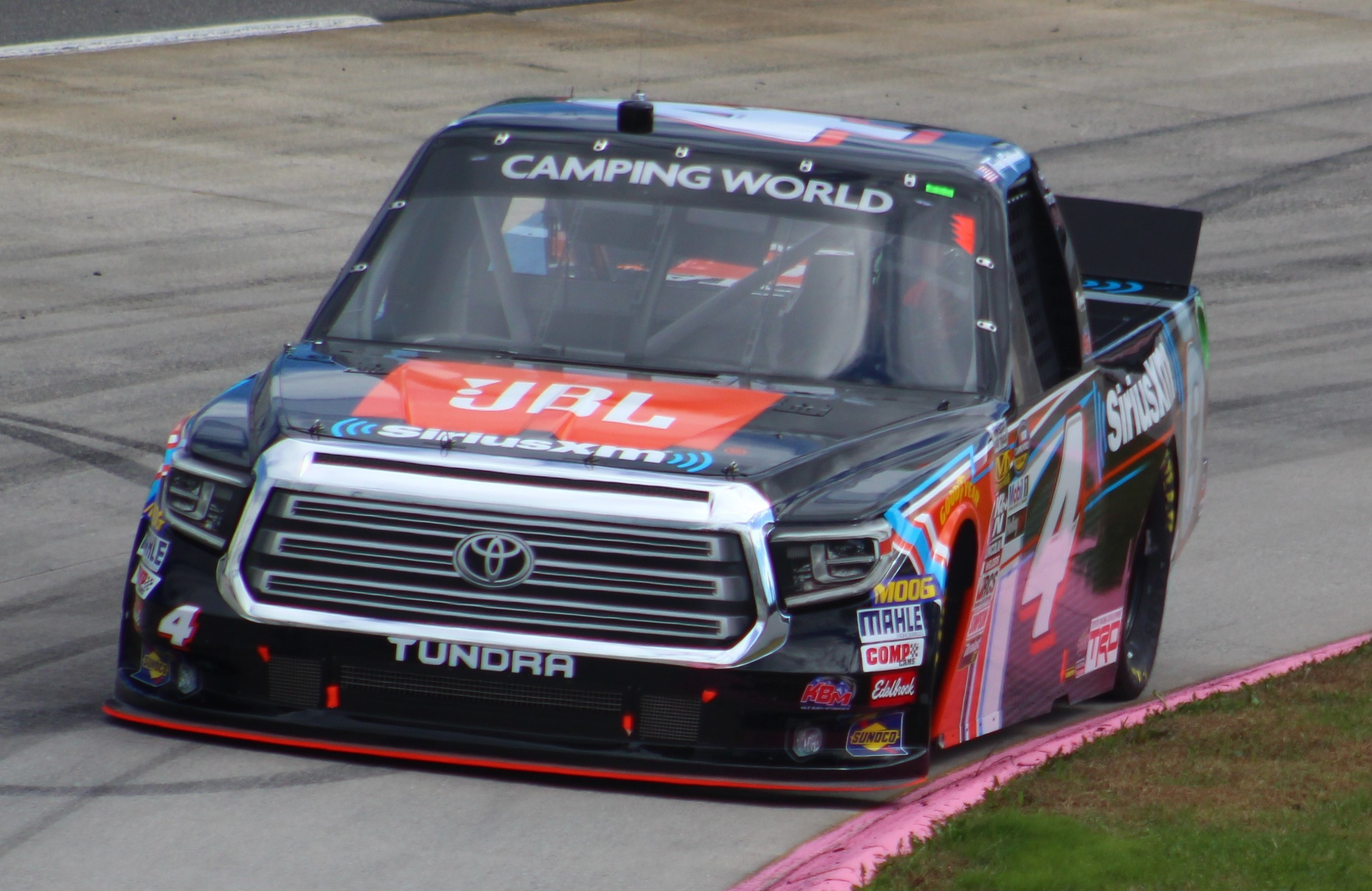
Gilliland's No. 4 for Kyle Busch Motorsports at Martinsville in October 2018

===== 2018 =====
On January 17, 2018, KBM announced that Gilliland would compete for NASCAR Camping World Truck Series Rookie of the Year in 2018, driving the No. 4 Toyota Tundra beginning at Martinsville Speedway, and most of the races following that. The series did grant Gilliland a waiver to become eligible for the NASCAR playoffs with a win, as drivers usually have to start every race to make the playoffs.

===== 2019 =====
On October 25, 2019, Gilliland won his first career Truck Series race at Martinsville Speedway.

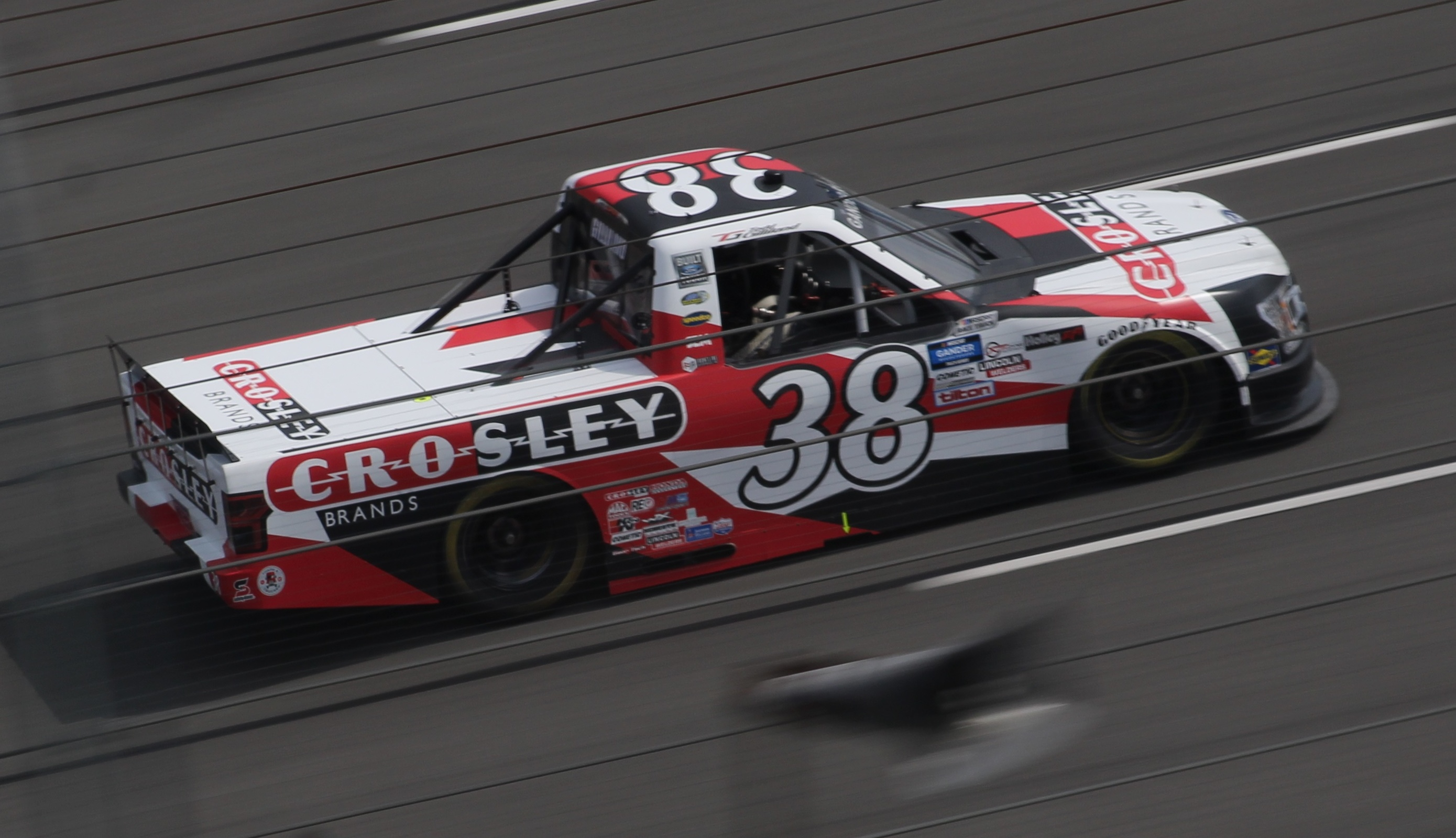
Gilliland's No. 38 for Front Row Motorsports at Pocono in 2020

===== 2020 =====
On January 13, 2020, Front Row Motorsports announced that Gilliland would drive the newly opened No. 38 Ford F-150 full-time for the 2020 season. Gilliland recorded ten top-ten finishes and four top-fives to qualify for the playoffs.

===== 2021 =====
Gilliland returned to the No. 38 in 2021. Gilliland won his second career Truck Series at Circuit of the Americas, his first win for Front Row Motorsports. With his win at COTA, Gilliland qualified for the playoffs and was eliminated after the Round of 10.

==== NASCAR Cup Series (2022–present ====
===== 2022 =====
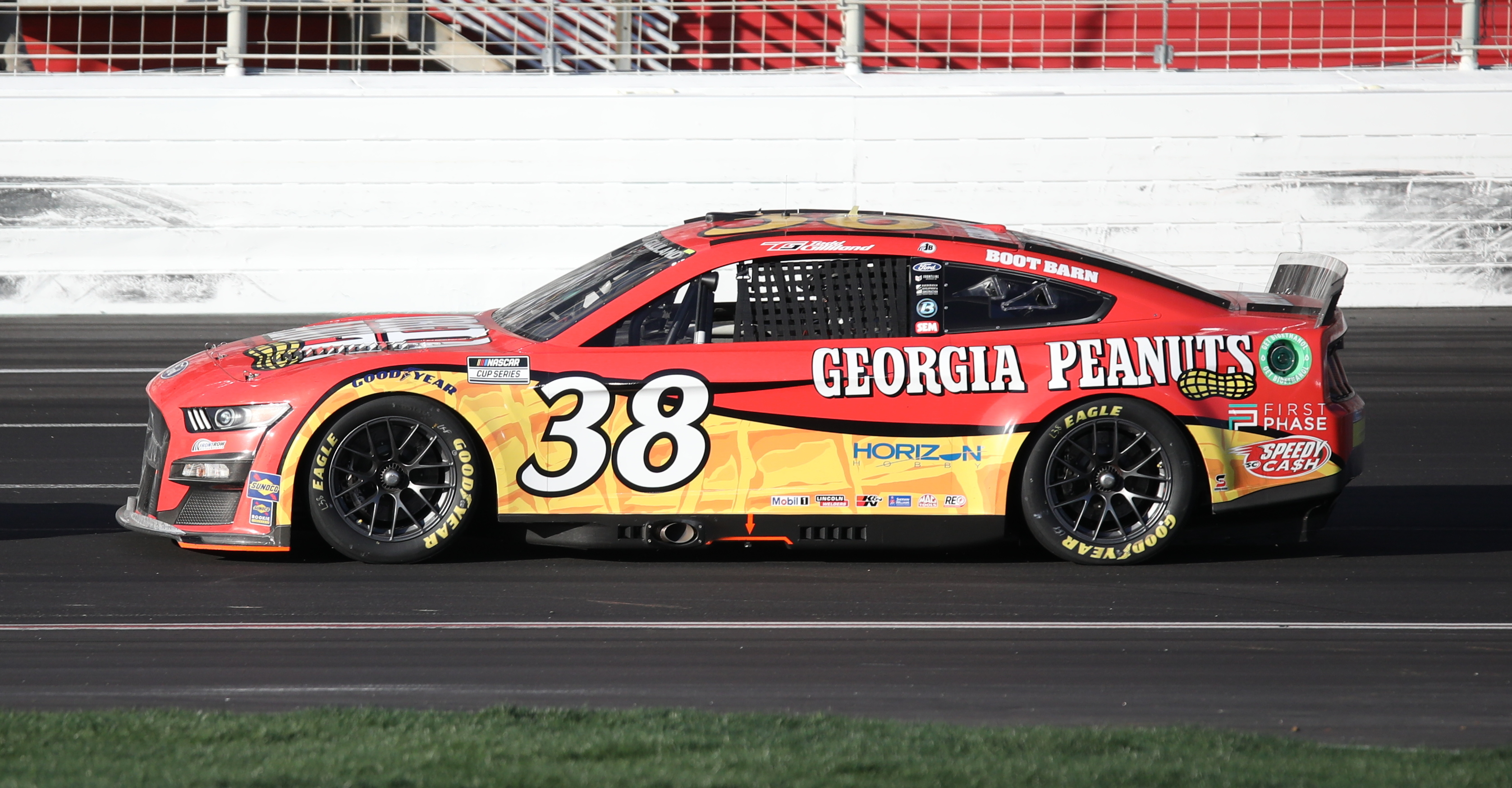
Gilliland in the No. 38 at Atlanta Motor Speedway in 2022

On November 30, 2021, Front Row Motorsports announced that Gilliland would bypass the Xfinity Series to drive Front Row's No. 38 Cup Series ride and compete for NASCAR Rookie of the Year. His first Cup Series race was at the 2022 Daytona 500. Gilliland started 29th and finished 33rd after being eliminated in an incident on lap 190.

===== 2023 =====
On December 15, 2022, Gilliland returned to the No. 38 car for his second full-time season in the Cup Series with new crew chief Ryan Bergenty. However, on February 7, Gilliland was demoted to a part-time ride since Zane Smith would be in the No. 38 car for six races. Gilliland however was able to sign a deal with Rick Ware Racing for five races; one in the No. 15 and four in the No. 51. On March 2, Front Row announced that Gilliland would race at Talladega in the No. 36 to complete his full season. He ended up finishing the season 28th in points, scoring four top-tens with a best finish of eighth.

===== 2024 =====
On August 9, it was announced that Gilliland would return to Front Row Motorsports in the No. 38 in 2024, which would mark his third season in the NASCAR Cup Series. Gilliland's early season performances showed improvement to the previous two years, as he led a then career-high sixteen laps at the Daytona 500 prior to being collected in a late-race incident, before surpassing that stat by leading the most laps at Atlanta with 58, though he would fall out of win contention late on with a broken toe link. During a run of nine consecutive Top 20 finishes in late spring and early summer, Gilliland signed a multi-year extension with Front Row. With four top-ten finishes and an average finish of 20.9, Gilliland finished 22nd in the standings, one position higher than his experienced teammate Michael McDowell.

===== 2025 =====
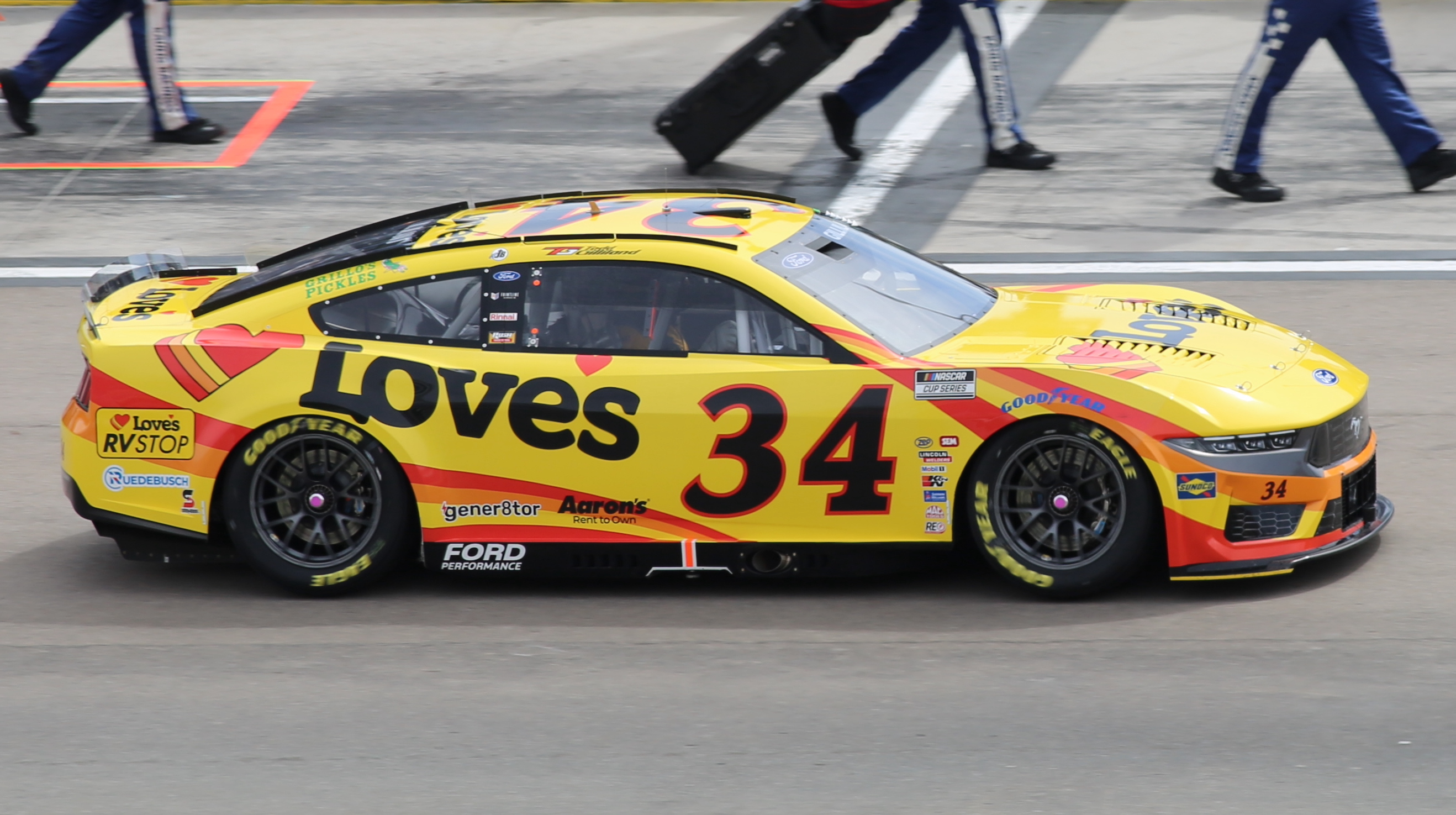
Gilliland's No. 34 car at Las Vegas Motor Speedway in 2025

On November 19, 2024, FRM announced that Gilliland would move to the No. 34 in 2025. He started the season with a 27th-place finish at the 2025 Daytona 500.

===== 2026 =====
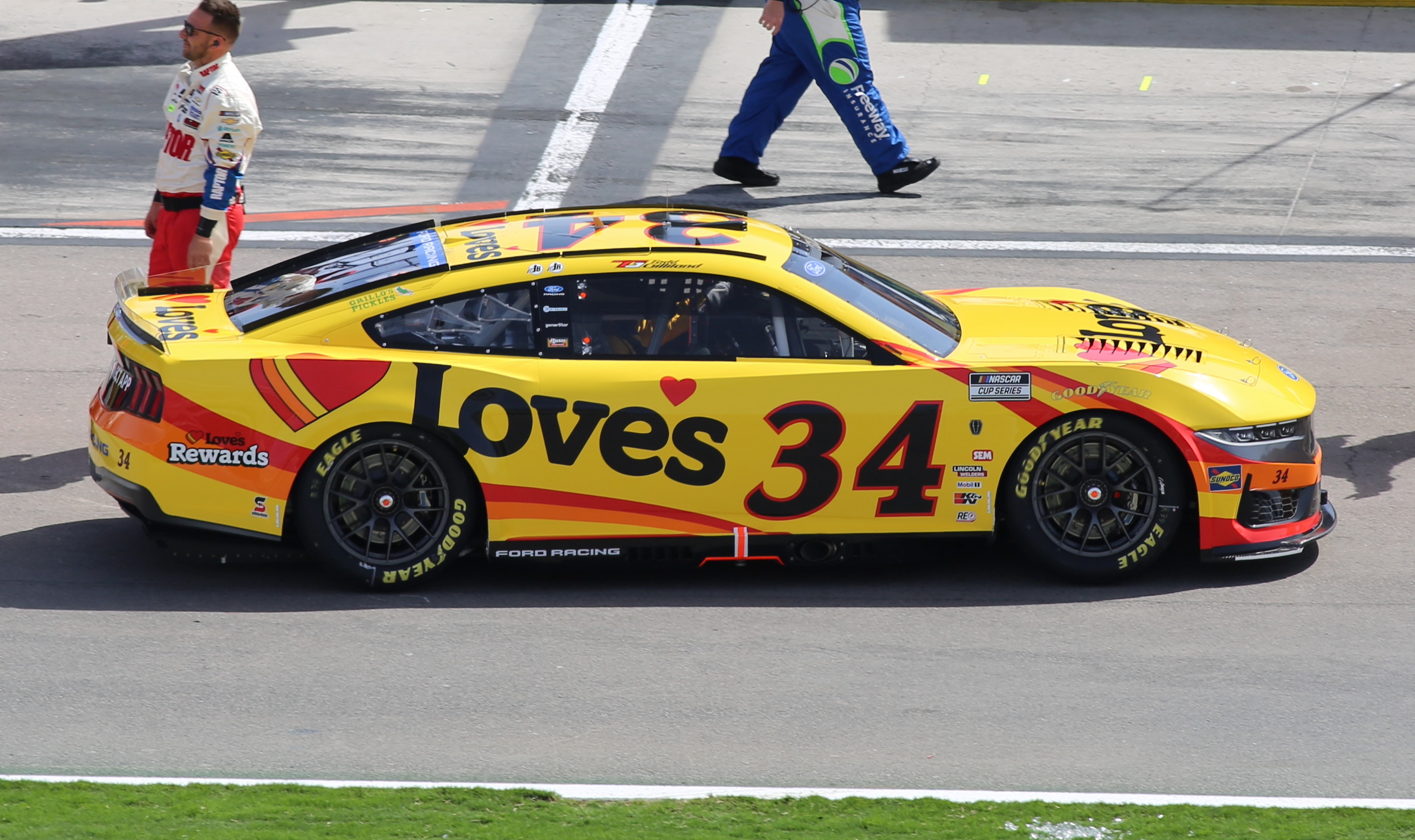
Gilliland's No. 34 car at Las Vegas Motor Speedway in 2026

Gilliland started the 2026 season with a 39th-place DNF at the 2026 Daytona 500. At Pocono, he won his first career stage before finishing 19th.

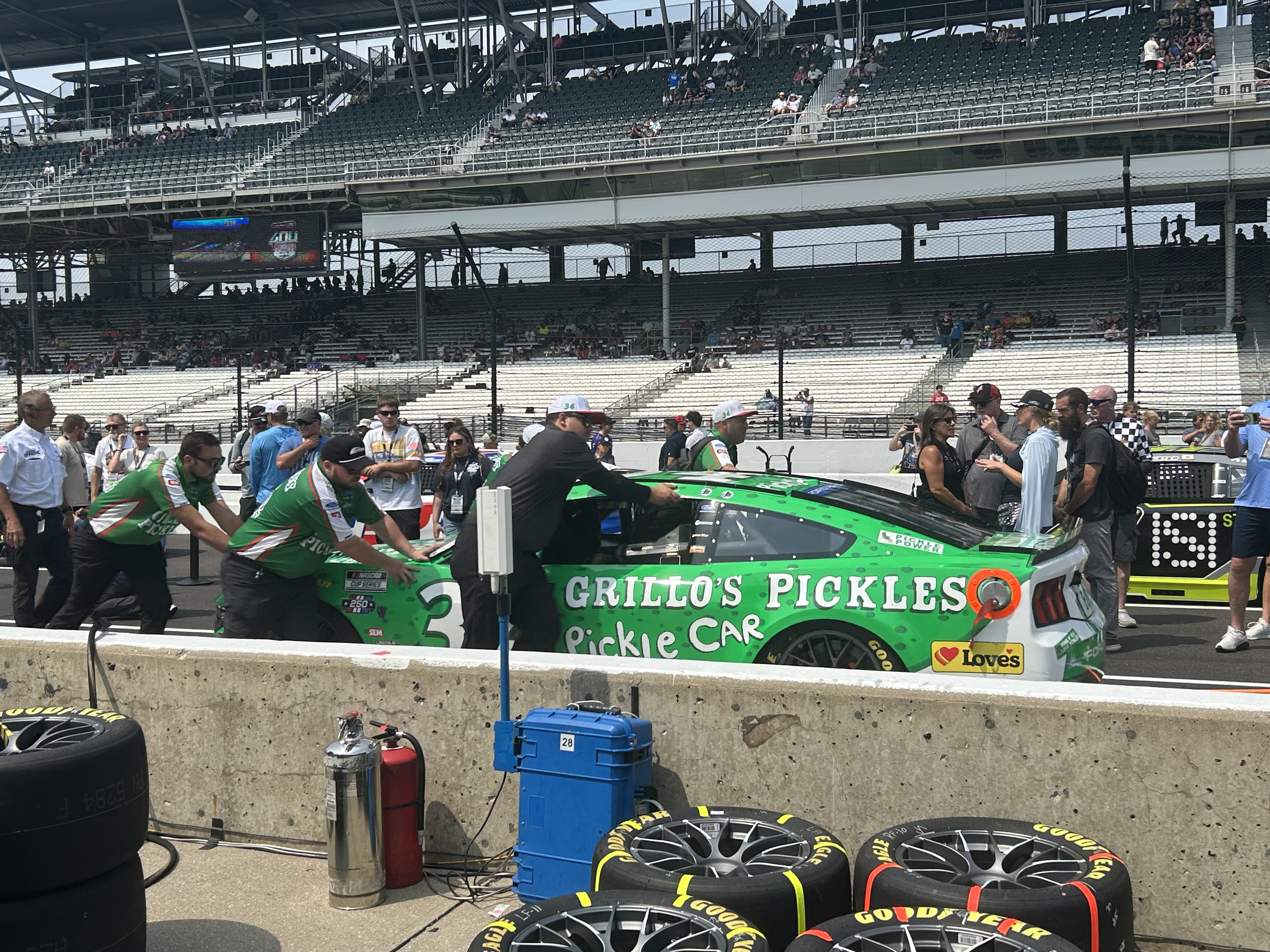
Gilliland's No. 34 being pushed to the grid before his In-Season Challenge win at Indianapolis

Seeded 25th in the 2026 NASCAR In-Season Challenge, Gilliland earned upset wins over Spire Motorsports teammates Daniel Suárez and Carson Hocevar at Sonoma and Chicagoland to advance to the Round of 8. At Atlanta he defeated Alex Bowman to advance to the Final Four. He defeated Bowman's Hendrick teammate Chase Elliott at North Wilkesboro to advance to the Finals at Indianapolis. He defeated Ryan Blaney by one car gap to win the NASCAR In-Season Challenge and the US$1 million prize.

===== 2027 =====
On July 17, 2026, it was announced that Gilliland signed a contract extension to remain at FRM for 2027.

== Personal life ==
Gilliland's father David formerly competed in the NASCAR Cup Series. His grandfather Butch, the 1997 NASCAR Winston West Series champion, formerly competed in the Cup and Truck Series.

== Motorsports career results ==
=== Stock car career summary ===
Season	Series	Team	Races	Wins	Top 5	Top 10	Points	Position
2015	CARS Super Late Model Tour	David Gilliland Racing	1	0	0	0	15	55th
2015	CARS Late Model Stock Car Tour	David Gilliland Racing	8	1	3	4	171	13th
2015	NASCAR K&N Pro Series West	Bill McAnally Racing	1	1	1	1	17	70th
2015	ARCA Racing Series	Venturini Motorsports	2	1	1	2	420	53rd
2016	CARS Super Late Model Tour	Kyle Busch Motorsports	2	0	0	1	48	33rd
2016	NASCAR K&N Pro Series West	Bill McAnally Racing	14	6	11	13	594	**1st**
2016	NASCAR K&N Pro Series East	Bill McAnally Racing	5	1	3	5	202	20th
2017	NASCAR K&N Pro Series West	Bill McAnally Racing	14	6	11	14	610	**1st**
2017	NASCAR K&N Pro Series East	Bill McAnally Racing	14	4	10	13	585	**2nd**
2017	NASCAR Camping World Truck Series	Kyle Busch Motorsports	6	0	2	3	178	27th
2018	NASCAR K&N Pro Series East	DGR-Crosley	3	2	2	2	127	22nd
2018	ARCA Racing Series	DGR-Crosley	4	0	2	3	830	25th
2018	NASCAR Camping World Truck Series	Kyle Busch Motorsports	19	0	4	9	590	10th
2019	NASCAR K&N Pro Series East	Bill McAnally Racing	1	0	0	1	77	23rd
2019	NASCAR K&N Pro Series East	DGR-Crosley	1	0	1	1	77	23rd
2019	ARCA Menards Series	DGR-Crosley	2	1	2	2	595	28th
2019	ARCA Menards Series	Joe Gibbs Racing	1	0	1	1	595	28th
2019	NASCAR Gander Outdoors Truck Series	Kyle Busch Motorsports	23	1	6	14	723	11th
2020	ARCA Menards Series West	DGR-Crosley	1	0	1	1	90	20th
2020	NASCAR Gander Outdoors Truck Series	Front Row Motorsports	23	0	4	10	2141	10th
2021	NASCAR Camping World Truck Series	Front Row Motorsports	23	1	10	16	2262	7th
2022	NASCAR Camping World Truck Series	David Gilliland Racing	1	1	1	1	0	NC†
2022	NASCAR Cup Series	Front Row Motorsports	36	0	1	2	531	28th
2023	NASCAR Cup Series	Front Row Motorsports	31	0	0	4	554	28th
2023	NASCAR Cup Series	Rick Ware Racing	5	0	0	0	554	28th
2024	NASCAR Cup Series	Front Row Motorsports	36	0	0	4	630	22nd
2025	NASCAR Cup Series	Front Row Motorsports	36	0	1	5	616	27th
2026	NASCAR Cup Series	Front Row Motorsports	36	0	0	3	656	21st

^{†} As Gilliland was a guest driver, he was ineligible for championship points.

=== NASCAR ===
(key) (Bold – Pole position awarded by qualifying time. Italics – Pole position earned by points standings or practice time. * – Most laps led.)

==== Cup Series ====
NASCAR Cup Series results
Year	Team	No.	Make	1	2	3	4	5	6	7	8	9	10	11	12	13	14	15	16	17	18	19	20	21	22	23	24	25	26	27	28	29	30	31	32	33	34	35	36	NCSC	Pts	Ref
2022	Front Row Motorsports	38	Ford	DAY; 33	CAL; 20	LVS; 23	PHO; 19	ATL; 27	COA; 16	RCH; 25	MAR; 30	BRD; 17	TAL; 27	DOV; 28	DAR; 15	KAN; 25	CLT; 16	GTW; 22	SON; 24	NSH; 24	ROA; 25	ATL; 17	NHA; 25	POC; 25	IRC; 4	MCH; 27	RCH; 27	GLN; 38	DAY; 23	DAR; 28	KAN; 23	BRI; 18	TEX; 28	TAL; 7	ROV; 30	LVS; 25	HOM; 31	MAR; 13	PHO; 29	28th	531	
2023	Front Row Motorsports	38	Ford	DAY; 27	CAL; 17	LVS; 31		ATL; 15	COA; 10	RCH; 15	BRD; 8	MAR; 25		DOV; 25	KAN; 24	DAR; 11		GTW; 15		NSH; 35	CSC; 19	ATL; 16	NHA; 21	POC; 15	RCH; 25	MCH; 29	IRC; 37	GLN; 11	DAY; 32	DAR; 26	KAN; 25	BRI; 16		TAL; 12		LVS; 27	HOM; 25	MAR; 10	PHO; 30	28th	554	
2023	Front Row Motorsports	36	Ford										TAL; 10																											28th	554	
2023	Rick Ware Racing	15	Ford				PHO; 32																																	28th	554	
2023	Rick Ware Racing	51	Ford														CLT; 33		SON; 24														TEX; 35		ROV; 23					28th	554	
2024	Front Row Motorsports	38	Ford	DAY; 35	ATL; 26*	LVS; 24	PHO; 17	BRI; 26	COA; 26	RCH; 21	MAR; 13	TEX; 31	TAL; 8	DOV; 31	KAN; 14	DAR; 15	CLT; 17	GTW; 16	SON; 10	IOW; 12	NHA; 12	NSH; 17	CSC; 7	POC; 34	IND; 6	RCH; 17	MCH; 36	DAY; 23	DAR; 17	ATL; 27	GLN; 16	BRI; 32	KAN; 27	TAL; 23	ROV; 18	LVS; 31	HOM; 20	MAR; 26	PHO; 20	22nd	630	
2025	Front Row Motorsports	34	Ford	DAY; 27	ATL; 15	COA; 10	PHO; 17	LVS; 29	HOM; 30	MAR; 10	DAR; 14	BRI; 35	TAL; 16	TEX; 11	KAN; 12	CLT; 18	NSH; 22	MCH; 33	MXC; 22	POC; 28	ATL; 27	CSC; 38	SON; 22	DOV; 25	IND; 6	IOW; 34	GLN; 28	RCH; 25	DAY; 11	DAR; 26	GTW; 32	BRI; 24	NHA; 19	KAN; 12	ROV; 17	LVS; 21	TAL; 2	MAR; 9	PHO; 22	27th	616	
2026	Front Row Motorsports	34	Ford	DAY; 39	ATL; 25	COA; 21	PHO; 12	LVS; 34	DAR; 23	MAR; 23	BRI; 6	KAN; 17	TAL; 11	TEX; 32	GLN; 17	CLT; 20	NSH; 20	MCH; 22	POC; 19	COR; 21	SON; 29	CHI; 16	ATL; 19	NWS; 8	IND; 24	IOW; 22	RCH; 30	NHA; 21	DAY; 19	DAR; 16	GTW; 24	BRI; 19	KAN; 19	LVS; 33	CLT; 22	PHO; 14	TAL; 7	MAR; 15	HOM; 18	21st	656	

===== Daytona 500 =====
Year	Team	Manufacturer	Start	Finish
2022	Front Row Motorsports	Ford	29	33
2023	Front Row Motorsports	Ford	14	27
2024	Front Row Motorsports	Ford	31	35
2025	Front Row Motorsports	Ford	14	27
2026	Front Row Motorsports	Ford	18	39

==== Camping World Truck Series ====
NASCAR Camping World Truck Series results
Year	Team	No.	Make	1	2	3	4	5	6	7	8	9	10	11	12	13	14	15	16	17	18	19	20	21	22	23	NCWTC	Pts	Ref
2017	Kyle Busch Motorsports	46	Toyota	DAY	ATL	MAR	KAN	CLT	DOV; 20	TEX													MAR; 5	TEX			27th	178	
2017	Kyle Busch Motorsports	51	Toyota								GTW; 21	IOW	KEN	ELD	POC	MCH	BRI	MSP; 11	CHI	NHA; 3	LVS	TAL			PHO; 7	HOM	27th	178	
2018	Kyle Busch Motorsports	4	Toyota	DAY	ATL	LVS	MAR; 14	DOV; 10	KAN	CLT; 10	TEX; 6*	IOW; 29	GTW; 2	CHI; 16	KEN; 7	ELD; 22	POC; 7	MCH; 5	BRI; 5	MSP; 11	LVS; 27	TAL; 20	**MAR**; 12	TEX; 4*	PHO; 17	HOM; 13	10th	590	
2019	Kyle Busch Motorsports	4	Toyota	DAY; 19	ATL; 9	LVS; 7	MAR; 15	TEX; 14	DOV; 15	KAN; 3	CLT; 7	**TEX**; 27	IOW; 10	GTW; 2	CHI; 6	KEN; 17	POC; 7	ELD; 5	MCH; 24	BRI; 9	MSP; 18	LVS; 5	TAL; 2	MAR; 1	PHO; 14	HOM; 8	11th	723	
2020	Front Row Motorsports	38	Ford	DAY; 16	LVS; 7	CLT; 37	ATL; 4	HOM; 6	POC; 4	KEN; 10	TEX; 27	KAN; 10	KAN; 20	MCH; 5	DRC; 33	DOV; 4	GTW; 24*	DAR; 7	RCH; 17	BRI; 14	LVS; 13	TAL; 28	KAN; 13	TEX; 31	MAR; 32	PHO; 9	10th	2141	
2021	Front Row Motorsports	38	Ford	DAY; 31	DRC; 4	LVS; 13	ATL; 17	BRD; 4	RCH; 6	KAN; 6	DAR; 15	COA; 1	**CLT**; 5	TEX; 7	NSH; 2	POC; 7	KNX; 4	GLN; 4	GTW; 29	DAR; 4	BRI; 10	LVS; 5*	TAL; 3*	MAR; 25*	PHO; 8		7th	2262	
2022	David Gilliland Racing	17	Ford	DAY	LVS	ATL	COA	MAR	BRD	DAR	KAN	TEX	CLT	GTW	SON	KNX; 1	NSH	MOH	POC	IRP	RCH	KAN	BRI	TAL	HOM	PHO	89th	0^{1}	

^{*} Season in progress
^{1} Ineligible for series points

=== ARCA Menards Series ===
(key) (Bold – Pole position awarded by qualifying time. Italics – Pole position earned by points standings or practice time. * – Most laps led.)

ARCA Menards Series results
Year	Team	No.	Make	1	2	3	4	5	6	7	8	9	10	11	12	13	14	15	16	17	18	19	20	AMSC	Pts	Ref
2015	Venturini Motorsports	55	Toyota	DAY	MOB	NSH	SLM	TAL	TOL; 1	NJE	POC	MCH	CHI	WIN	IOW; 9	IRP	POC	BLN	ISF	DSF	SLM	KEN	KAN	53rd	420	
2018	DGR-Crosley	54	Toyota	DAY	NSH	SLM	TAL	TOL	**CLT**; 4*	POC	MCH	MAD	GTW	CHI; 3	IOW	ELK	POC; 6	ISF	BLN	DSF	SLM	IRP	KAN; 22	25th	830	
2019	DGR-Crosley	4	Toyota	DAY; 2	FIF	SLM	TAL; 1	NSH	TOL	CLT	POC	MCH	MAD	GTW	CHI	ELK	IOW							28th	595	
2019	Joe Gibbs Racing	18	Toyota															**POC**; 2*	ISF	DSF	SLM	IRP	KAN	28th	595	

==== K&N Pro Series East ====
NASCAR K&N Pro Series East results
Year	Team	No.	Make	1	2	3	4	5	6	7	8	9	10	11	12	13	14	NKNPSEC	Pts	Ref
2016	Bill McAnally Racing	16	Toyota	**NSM**; 1*	MOB	GRE	BRI; 9	VIR	DOM	STA; 5	COL; 7	NHA; 2	IOW	GLN	GRE	NJM	DOV	20th	202	
2017	Bill McAnally Racing	16	Toyota	NSM; 9	GRE; 3	BRI; 8	SBO; 3	SBO; 2	MEM; 8	BLN; 1	THO; 2*	NHA; 1*	IOW; 1*	GLN; 2	**LGY**; 1	NJM; 2	DOV; 13	2nd	585	
2018	DGR-Crosley	54	Toyota	NSM; 1*													DOV; 14	22nd	127	
2018	DGR-Crosley	98	Toyota		BRI; 1*	LGY	SBO	SBO	MEM	NJM	THO	NHA	IOW	GLN	GTW	NHA		22nd	127	
2019	Bill McAnally Racing	19	Toyota	NSM	BRI	SBO	SBO	MEM; 8	NHA	IOW	GLN	BRI	GTW	NHA				23rd	77	
2019	DGR-Crosley	54	Toyota												DOV; 3			23rd	77	

==== ARCA Menards Series West ====
ARCA Menards Series West results
Year	Team	No.	Make	1	2	3	4	5	6	7	8	9	10	11	12	13	14	AMSWC	Pts	Ref
2015	Bill McAnally Racing	16	Toyota	KCR	IRW	TUS	IOW	SHA	SON	SLS	IOW	EVG	CNS	MER	AAS	**PHO**; 1		70th	17	
2016	Bill McAnally Racing	16	Toyota	**IRW**; 1	**KCR**; 1*	TUS; 2	OSS; 4	**CNS**; 2	SON; 24	SLS; 1	**IOW**; 1*	**EVG**; 1*	**DCS**; 6*	MMP; 2	MMP; 2	MER; 1	AAS; 8	1st	594	
2017	Bill McAnally Racing	16	Toyota	**TUS**; 2	**KCR**; 1	**IRW**; 1*	**IRW**; 1*	**SPO**; 1*	OSS; 6	CNS; 3*	SON; 6	IOW; 1*	EVG; 8	DCS; 1	**MER**; 2*	AAS; 2	**KCR**; 2	1st	610	
2020	DGR-Crosley	54	Ford	LVS	MMP	MMP	IRW	EVG	DCS	CNS	LVS	AAS	KCR	PHO; 4				20th	90	

=== CARS Late Model Stock Car Tour ===
(key) (Bold – Pole position awarded by qualifying time. Italics – Pole position earned by points standings or practice time. * – Most laps led. ** – All laps led.)

CARS Late Model Stock Car Tour results
Year	Team	No.	Make	1	2	3	4	5	6	7	8	9	10	CLMSCTC	Pts	Ref
2015	David Gilliland Racing	98G	Ford	SNM; 1	ROU; 27	HCY; 27	SNM; 3	TCM; 19	MMS; 2	ROU; 19	CON	MYB; 6	HCY	13th	171	

=== CARS Super Late Model Tour ===
(key)

CARS Super Late Model Tour results
Year	Team	No.	Make	1	2	3	4	5	6	7	8	9	10	CSLMTC	Pts	Ref
2015	David Gilliland Racing	98G	Ford	SNM	ROU	HCY	SNM	TCM	MMS; 18	ROU	CON	MYB	HCY	55th	15	
2016	Kyle Busch Motorsports	51B	Toyota	SNM	ROU	HCY	TCM	GRE	ROU	CON	MYB; 7	HCY		33rd	48	
2016	Kyle Busch Motorsports	54G	Toyota										SNM; 11	33rd	48	

Sporting positions
Preceded by Chris Eggleston	NASCAR K&N Pro Series West Champion; 2016–2017	Succeeded by Derek Thorn
Achievements
Preceded by Noah Gragson	NASCAR K&N Pro Series West Rookie of the Year; 2016	Succeeded by Derek Kraus
