= ASA Late Model Series =

American stock car racing series

- Sport: Auto racing
- Founded: 2003
- Country: United States
- Most recent champions: Sunoco NT: Brian Campbell; Northern: Chris Eggleston; Southern: Drew Brannon

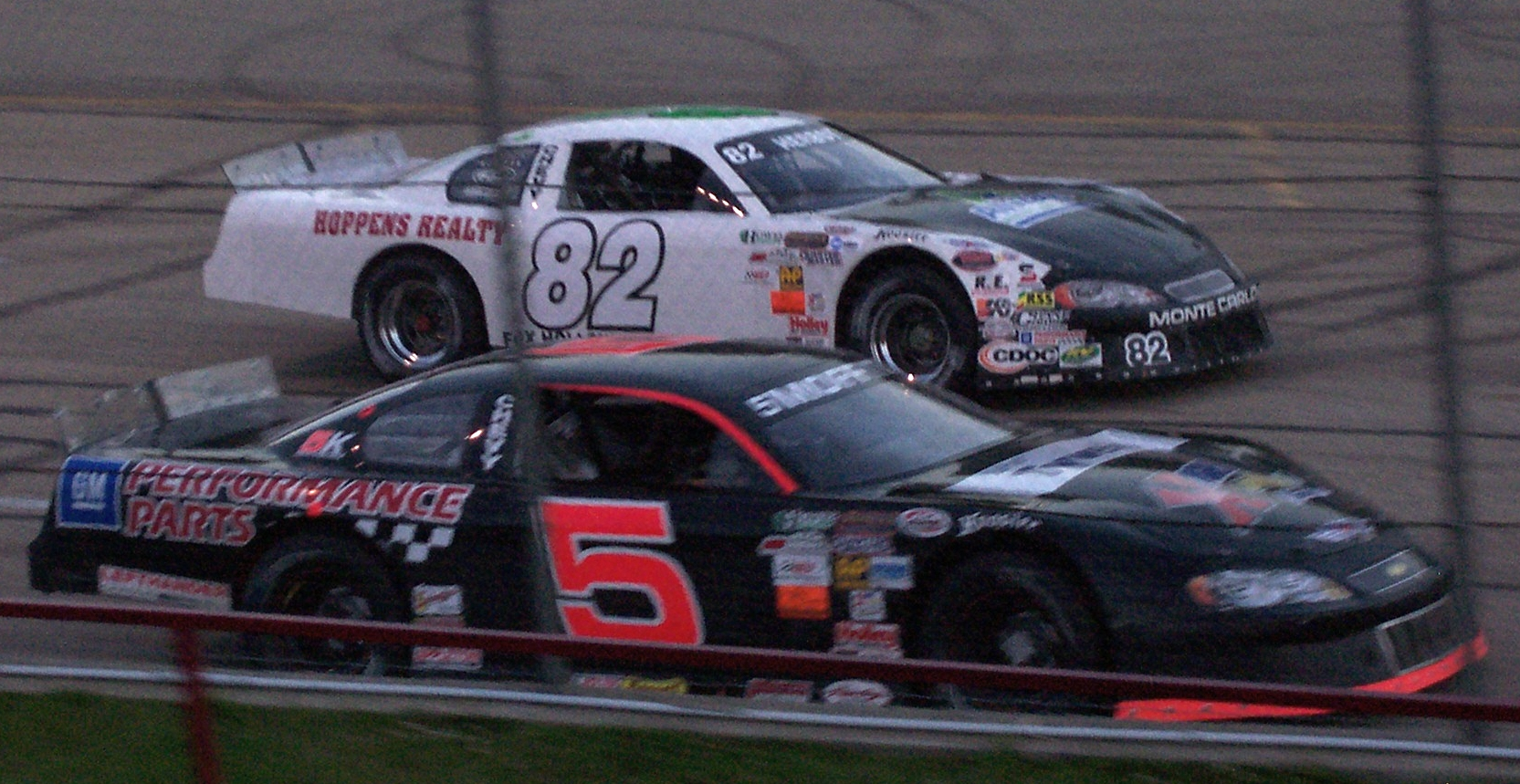
2008 cars

The ASA Late Model Series was an American stock car racing series. Founded by Ron Varney in 2003 as the "USPRO Cup Series", it was renamed "ASA Late Model Series" when it was purchased by the American Speed Association in 2004. After financial difficulties during the 2004 season, the series was sold back to its founders, but retained the name.

In the fall of 2005, Varney purchased the Southern All-Stars Asphalt Late Model Series to form the ASA Late Models South Series, plus the creation of the ASA Late Models North Series as regional touring series. The ASA Late Model Series was renamed the ASA Late Model Challenge Series.

== Champions ==
=== Challenge Division ===
- 2010: Brent Downey
- 2009: Brian Campbell
- 2008: Peter Cozzolino
- 2007: Travis Dassow
- 2006: Kelly Bires (also won Pat Burdow Memorial Rookie of the Year)
- 2005: Stephen Leicht
- 2004: Bobby Stremme (also won Pat Burdow Memorial Rookie of the Year)
- 2003: Mark Kortz (as USPro Cup Series)

=== Northern Division ===
- 2010: Eddie Hoffman
- 2009: Chris Eggleston
- 2008: Eddie Hoffman
- 2007: Trent Snyder
- 2006: Jesse Smith

=== Southern Division ===
- 2009: Drew Brannon
- 2008: Jimmy Lang
- 2007: Jeff Choquette
- 2006: James Buescher

== ASA naming dispute ==
As part of the splinter of the American Speed Association caused by the 2004 season, the American Speed Association was broken up. The Late Model Series was reacquired by Varney, while other assets were sold to Racing Speed Associates, led by Dennis Huth.

In December 2007, Dennis Huth filed a lawsuit against the ASA Late Model Series seeking to invalidate and cancel the ASA Late Model Series trademark registration. The ASA Late Model Series responded that the lawsuit is frivolous and without merit and plan counter sue Mr. Huth for damages caused by suit.

On January 14, 2009, the naming dispute was settled. In the end, both parties were allowed to keep the "ASA" name, but the ASA Late Model Series was forced to come up with a new logo, and both parties agreed to inform the racing public that the ASA Late Model Series is not related to, affiliated with, nor sponsored or endorsed by American Speed Association or ASA Racing.

On October 11, 2010 it was announced publicly that in an Order signed on October 7, 2010 by US District Court Judge Matthew Kennelly, has permanently barred Louis R. (Ron) Varney, Jr, ASA Late Model Series, LLC and all those acting in concert or participation with them, including specifically ASALMS, LLC from any further use of the ASA or ASA Late Model Series brand on or in connection with automobile race events anywhere in the United States. The injunction was delivered at the 2010 Oktoberfest Race Weekend at the La Crosse Fairgrounds Speedway. This forced the ASA Late Model Series cars to remove the any decals with the "ASA" name, and the ASA Late Model Series trailer to be removed from the premises. The organization has not been active following the injunction.
