= 2017 NASCAR K&N Pro Series West =

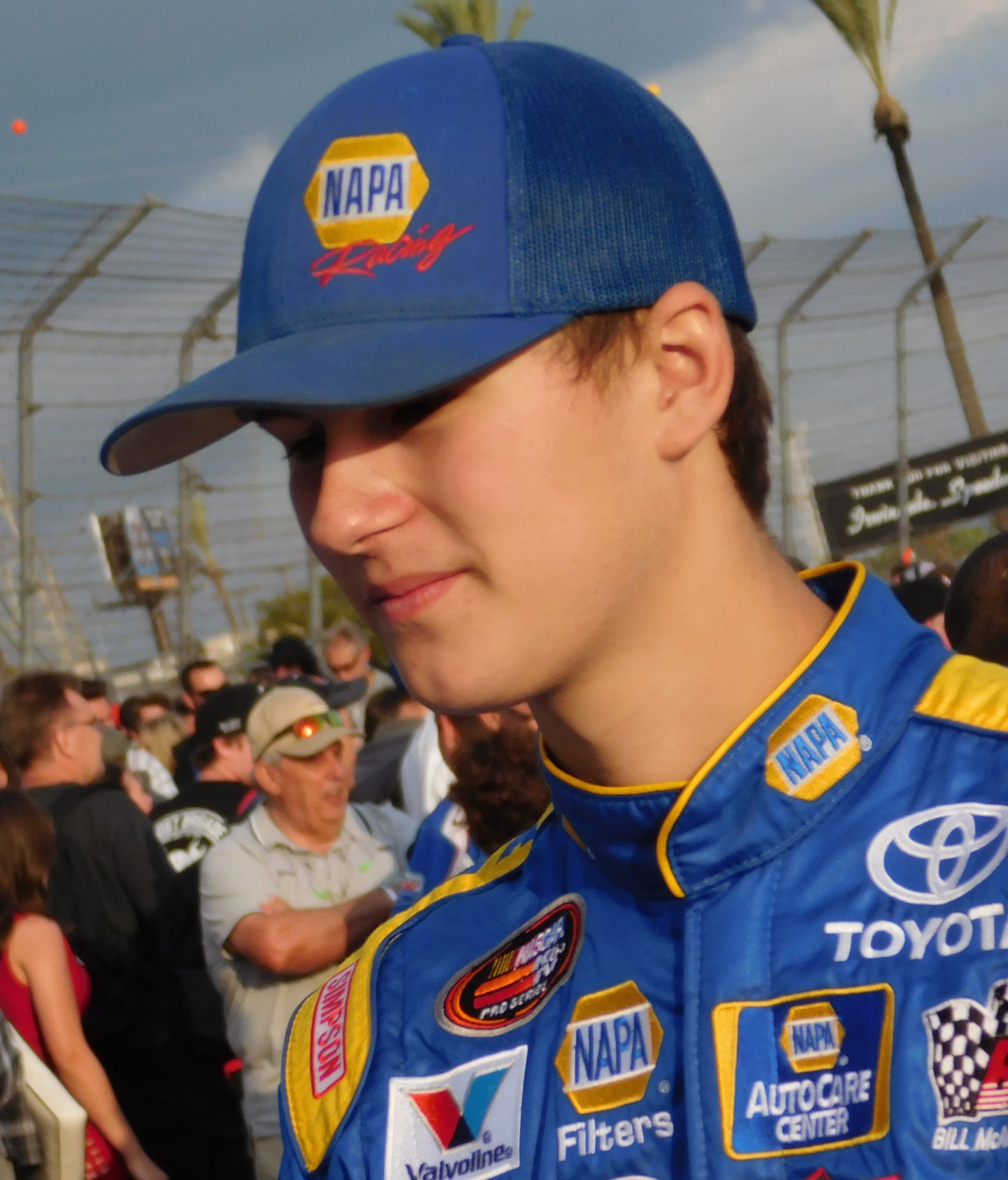
Todd Gilliland, the 2017 K&N Pro Series West champion. This was the second of his two consecutive titles.

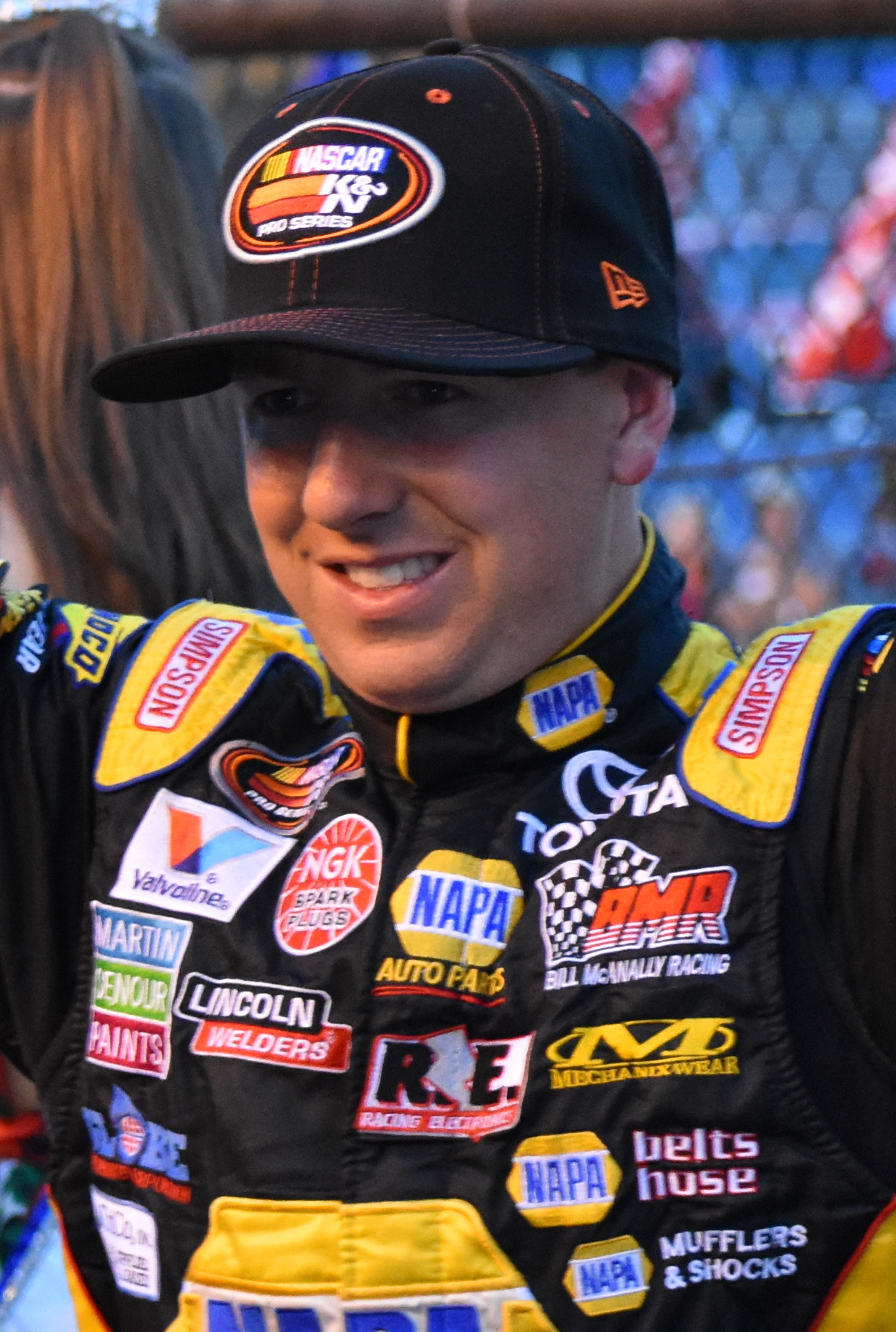
Chris Eggleston, the 2015 champion, finished second behind Gilliland in the championship by 29 points.

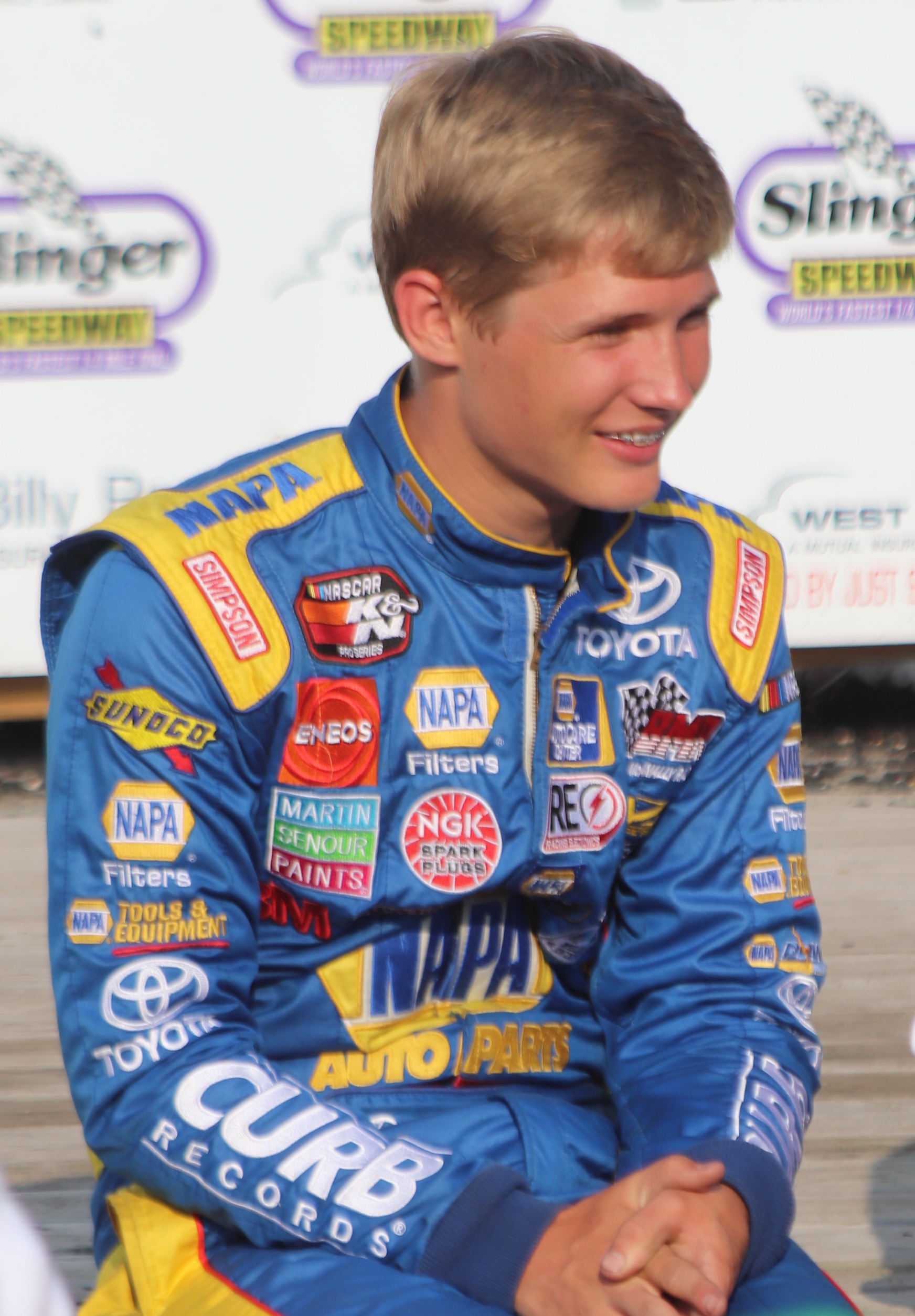
Derek Kraus finished third in the championship.

The 2017 NASCAR K&N Pro Series West was the sixty-fourth season of the K&N Pro Series West, a regional stock car racing series sanctioned by NASCAR. It began with the NAPA Auto Parts Tucson 150 at Tucson Speedway on March 18 and concluded with the West Coast Stock Car Hall of Fame Championship 150 presented by NAPA Auto Parts at Kern County Raceway Park on November 4. Todd Gilliland was the defending drivers' champion and he won the championship again in 2017, becoming the first back-to-back champion in the West Series since Mike Duncan in 2004 and 2005.

== Teams and drivers ==
=== Complete schedule ===
| Manufacturer | Team | No. | Driver | Crew chief |
|---|---|---|---|---|
| Chevrolet | John Krebs Racing | 11 | Takuma Koga | Thomas Wicks 12; Justin Funkhouser 1 Charlie Silva 1 |
| Chevrolet | Levin Racing | 10 | Matt Levin | Chase Newell 9 Scott Strachan 5 |
| Chevrolet | Steve Portenga Racing | 21 | Blaine Perkins | Steve Portenga |
| Ford | Jefferson Pitts Racing | 7 | Will Rodgers | Jeff Jefferson |
| Ford | Patriot Motorsports Group | 32 | Kody Vanderwal | Rudy Vanderwal 6 Jason Dickenson 8 |
| Ford | Sunrise Ford Racing | 6 | Julia Landauer | Bill Sedgwick |
| Ford | Sunrise Ford Racing | 9 | Zane Smith (R) 1 | Jeff Schrader |
| Ford | Sunrise Ford Racing | 9 | Michael Self 13 | Jeff Schrader |
| Toyota | Bill McAnally Racing | 16 | Todd Gilliland | Chris Lawson |
| Toyota | Bill McAnally Racing | 19 | Derek Kraus (R) | Ty Joiner |
| Toyota | Bill McAnally Racing | 99 | Chris Eggleston | Bryan Tasnady |
| Toyota | Central Coast Racing | 13 | Todd Souza | Michael Muñoz |
| Toyota | Nicole Behar Racing | 33 | Nicole Behar | Mike Behar |
| Ford 13 Chevrolet 1 | Kart Idaho Racing | 30 | Brandon Schilling (R) 2 | Jason Dickerson 2 Darrel Pederson 2 Kent Smith 5 Sonny Wahl 4 Kevin McCarty 1 |
| Ford 13 Chevrolet 1 | Kart Idaho Racing | 30 | Stafford Smith 11 | Jason Dickerson 2 Darrel Pederson 2 Kent Smith 5 Sonny Wahl 4 Kevin McCarty 1 |
| Ford 13 Chevrolet 1 | Kart Idaho Racing | 30 | Dave Smith 1 | Jason Dickerson 2 Darrel Pederson 2 Kent Smith 5 Sonny Wahl 4 Kevin McCarty 1 |
| Chevrolet 13 Ford 1 | Norman Levin Racing | 40 | Ron Norman | Erik Higley 13; Christopher Thomas 1 |
| Ford 12 Toyota 2 | Patriot Motorsports Group | 14 | Dan Phillippi (R) 5 | Stafford Smith 4 Mike Holleran 2 Nick Sommers 1 Kevin McCarty 1 Jason Larivee Jr. 2 Dan Engberson 1 Jim Vermillion 1 Darrel Pederson 1 John Wood 1 |
| Ford 12 Toyota 2 | Patriot Motorsports Group | 14 | Andrew Engberson (R) 4 | Stafford Smith 4 Mike Holleran 2 Nick Sommers 1 Kevin McCarty 1 Jason Larivee Jr. 2 Dan Engberson 1 Jim Vermillion 1 Darrel Pederson 1 John Wood 1 |
| Ford 12 Toyota 2 | Patriot Motorsports Group | 14 | John Wood 1 | Stafford Smith 4 Mike Holleran 2 Nick Sommers 1 Kevin McCarty 1 Jason Larivee Jr. 2 Dan Engberson 1 Jim Vermillion 1 Darrel Pederson 1 John Wood 1 |
| Ford 12 Toyota 2 | Patriot Motorsports Group | 14 | Bryant Barnhill (R) 1 | Stafford Smith 4 Mike Holleran 2 Nick Sommers 1 Kevin McCarty 1 Jason Larivee Jr. 2 Dan Engberson 1 Jim Vermillion 1 Darrel Pederson 1 John Wood 1 |
| Ford 12 Toyota 2 | Patriot Motorsports Group | 14 | Zack St. Onge (R) 1 | Stafford Smith 4 Mike Holleran 2 Nick Sommers 1 Kevin McCarty 1 Jason Larivee Jr. 2 Dan Engberson 1 Jim Vermillion 1 Darrel Pederson 1 John Wood 1 |
| Ford 12 Toyota 2 | Patriot Motorsports Group | 14 | Jonas Fors (R) 1 | Stafford Smith 4 Mike Holleran 2 Nick Sommers 1 Kevin McCarty 1 Jason Larivee Jr. 2 Dan Engberson 1 Jim Vermillion 1 Darrel Pederson 1 John Wood 1 |
| Ford 12 Toyota 2 | Patriot Motorsports Group | 14 | Jerry de Weerdt (R) 1 | Stafford Smith 4 Mike Holleran 2 Nick Sommers 1 Kevin McCarty 1 Jason Larivee Jr. 2 Dan Engberson 1 Jim Vermillion 1 Darrel Pederson 1 John Wood 1 |
| Chevrolet 4 Toyota 10 | Patriot Motorsports Group | 36 | Jesse Iwuji | Joe Ransom 4 Sonny Wahl 1 Mike Holleran 3 Kevin McCarty 1 Charlie Wahl 4 Randy Reckley 1 |
| Chevrolet 13 Ford 1 | Patriot Motorsports Group | 38 | Salvatore Iovino (R) 5 | Sonny Wahl 6 Nick Sommers 2 Mike Holleran 5 Chris Clyne 1 |
| Chevrolet 13 Ford 1 | Patriot Motorsports Group | 38 | John Wood 7 | Sonny Wahl 6 Nick Sommers 2 Mike Holleran 5 Chris Clyne 1 |
| Chevrolet 13 Ford 1 | Patriot Motorsports Group | 38 | Stafford Smith 1 | Sonny Wahl 6 Nick Sommers 2 Mike Holleran 5 Chris Clyne 1 |
| Chevrolet 13 Ford 1 | Patriot Motorsports Group | 38 | Davey Hamilton Jr. (R) 1 | Sonny Wahl 6 Nick Sommers 2 Mike Holleran 5 Chris Clyne 1 |

=== Limited schedule ===
| Manufacturer | Team | No. | Driver | Crew chief | Rounds |
|---|---|---|---|---|---|
| Chevrolet | Carlos Vieira Racing | 51 | Carlos Vieira | Travis Bryans | 1 |
| Chevrolet | DeLong Racing | 84 | Rich DeLong III | Chris Dittes | 8 |
| Chevrolet | Hillis Racing | 0 | Bobby Hillis Jr. | Ralph E. Byers | 3 |
| Chevrolet | McGowan Motorsports | 17 | David Mayhew | Gary Collins 1 Matt Ross 1 | 2 |
| Chevrolet | Don Newman | 90 | Trevor Cristiani (R) | Danny Cristiani 4 Steve Teets 1 | 5 |
| Chevrolet | Patriots Motorsports Group | 34 | Rudy Vanderwal (R) | Brian Yackey | 1 |
| Chevrolet | Patriots Motorsports Group | 34 | Tyler Fabozzi (R) | Sonny Wahl | 1 |
| Chevrolet | Performance P-1 Motorsports | 77 | Kevin O'Connell | Tony Jackson | 1 |
| Chevrolet | Roadrunner Motorsports | 20 | Jim Inglebright | Rodney Haygood | 1 |
| Chevrolet | Rodd Racing | 68 | Rodd Kneeland (R) | Trent Musser | 1 |
| Chevrolet | Charlie Silva | 5 | Justin Funkhouser | Brian Carson | 2 |
| Chevrolet | Spurgeon Motorsports | 86 | Tim Spurgeon | Mike Davis | 1 |
| Chevrolet | Spurgeon Motorsports | 86 | Hollis Thackeray (R) | Mike Doss | 1 |
| Chevrolet | Sonny Wahl | 42 | Zack St. Onge (R) | Jim Vermillion | 1 |
| Ford | Troy Cline | 88 | Ryan Blaney | Doug Chouinard | 1 |
| Ford | Jefferson Pitts Racing | 4 | Kevin Harvick | Richard Boswell | 1 |
| Ford | Jefferson Pitts Racing | 27 | Garrett Archer (R) | Jerry Pitts 12; Jeff Jefferson 1 | 5 |
| Ford | Jefferson Pitts Racing | 27 | Sheldon Creed (R) | Jerry Pitts 12; Jeff Jefferson 1 | 1 |
| Ford | Jefferson Pitts Racing | 27 | Gracin Raz | Jerry Pitts 12; Jeff Jefferson 1 | 1 |
| Ford | Jefferson Pitts Racing | 27 | Tayler Riddle (R) | Jerry Pitts 12; Jeff Jefferson 1 | 1 |
| Ford | Jefferson Pitts Racing | 27 | Buddy Shepherd (R) | Jerry Pitts 12; Jeff Jefferson 1 | 1 |
| Ford | Jefferson Pitts Racing | 27 | Max Tullman (R) | Jerry Pitts 12; Jeff Jefferson 1 | 3 |
| Ford | Jefferson Pitts Racing | 55 | Vanessa Robinson (R) | Jason Jefferson | 1 |
| Ford | Jefferson Pitts Racing | 55 | Owen Riddle (R) | Jason Jefferson | 1 |
| Ford | Jefferson Pitts Racing | 55 | Sheldon Creed (R) | Jerry Pitts | 1 |
| Ford | Jefferson Pitts Racing | 55 | Buddy Shepherd (R) | Denny Bowyer | 1 |
| Ford | Courtney O'Donnell | 91 | Dan O'Donnell (R) | William Loe | 2 |
| Ford | REF Motorsports | 4 | Rod Johnson Jr. (R) | Mark Perry | 1 |
| Ford | Sunrise Ford Racing | 22 | Derek Thorn | Mike Keen | 1 |
| Ford | Thompson Motorsports | 61 | Johnny Borneman III | Will Harris | 4 |
| Ford | Thompson Motorsports | 61 | Braeden Havens | Will Harris | 1 |
| Toyota | Bassett Racing | 04 | Ronnie Bassett Jr. | Kris Bowen | 1 |
| Toyota | Bassett Racing | 44 | Dillon Bassett | Skip Eyler | 1 |
| Toyota | Bill McAnally Racing | 20 | Cole Moore (R) | Mario Isola | 1 |
| Toyota | Bill McAnally Racing | 43 | Derek Thorn | Mike Keen | 1 |
| Toyota | Bill McAnally Racing | 54 | Riley Herbst | Shannon Rursch 4 Kevin Manion 1 | 5 |
| Toyota | Bill McAnally Racing | 54 | Will Gallaher (R) | Roger Bracken | 1 |
| Toyota | Ivie Racing | 47 | Scott Ivie | Mike D'Arcy | 1 |
| Toyota | MDM Motorsports | 12 | Daniel Suárez | Mardy Lindley | 1 |
| Toyota 4 Chevrolet 3 | Patriot Motorsports Group | 39 | Andrew Tuttle (R) | Kevin McCarty 4 Kent Smith 1 Sonny Wahl 1 Dave Hansen 1 | 2 |
| Toyota 4 Chevrolet 3 | Patriot Motorsports Group | 39 | Rudy Vanderwal (R) | Kevin McCarty 4 Kent Smith 1 Sonny Wahl 1 Dave Hansen 1 | 1 |
| Toyota 4 Chevrolet 3 | Patriot Motorsports Group | 39 | Dan Phillippi (R) | Kevin McCarty 4 Kent Smith 1 Sonny Wahl 1 Dave Hansen 1 | 1 |
| Toyota 4 Chevrolet 3 | Patriot Motorsports Group | 39 | Josh Fanopoulos (R) | Kevin McCarty 4 Kent Smith 1 Sonny Wahl 1 Dave Hansen 1 | 2 |
| Toyota 4 Chevrolet 3 | Patriot Motorsports Group | 39 | Jonas Fors (R) | Kevin McCarty 4 Kent Smith 1 Sonny Wahl 1 Dave Hansen 1 | 1 |

== Schedule ==
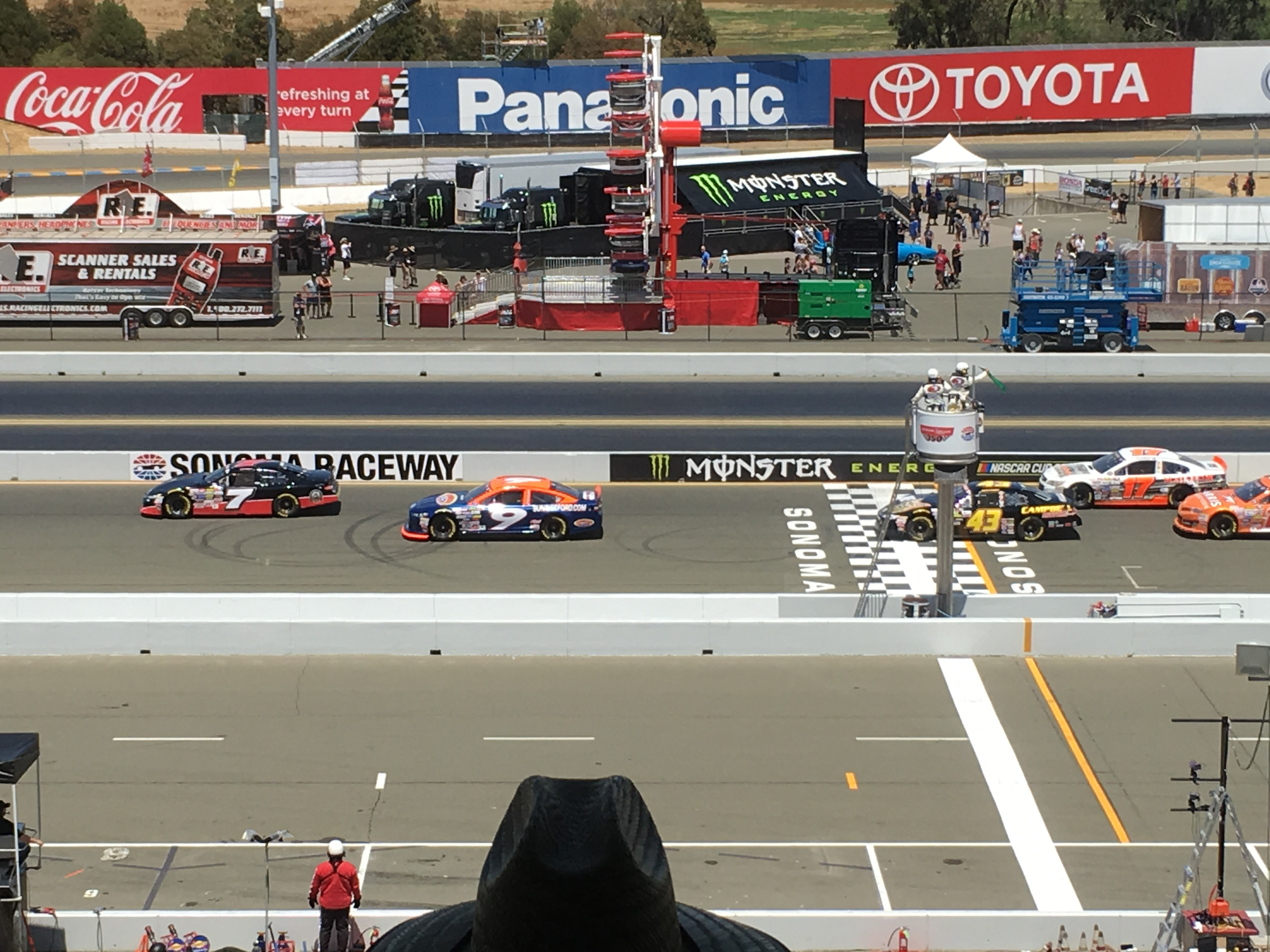
The Carneros 200 at Sonoma Raceway in June

All of the races in the 2017 season were televised on NBCSN and were on a tape delay basis.

| No. | Race title | Track | Date |
|---|---|---|---|
| 1 | NAPA Auto Parts Tucson 150 | Tucson Speedway, Tucson, Arizona | March 18 |
| 2 | NAPA Auto Parts 150 | Kern County Raceway Park, Bakersfield, California | March 23 |
| 3 | NAPA Auto Parts Twin 100s | Irwindale Speedway, Irwindale, California | March 25 |
| 4 | NAPA Auto Parts Twin 100s | Irwindale Speedway, Irwindale, California | March 25 |
| 5 | Toyota/NAPA Auto Parts 150 | Spokane County Raceway, Airway Heights, Washington | May 13 |
| 6 | Sunrise Ford 150 presented by Pinnacle Peak Steakhouse | Orange Show Speedway, San Bernardino, California | May 20 |
| 7 | NAPA Auto Parts/Toyota 150 | Colorado National Speedway, Dacono, Colorado | June 10 |
| 8 | Carneros 200 | Sonoma Raceway, Sonoma, California | June 24 |
| 9 | Casey's General Store 150 presented by Vatterott College (Note: The Casey's General Store 150 presented by Vatterott College was held as a combined event, with competitors from the K&N Pro Series West competing along with competitors for the K&N Pro Series East. Unlike in previous years, drivers received points and statistical credit relative to the whole field in general, instead of relative to other drivers in their series. Also drivers were allowed to score points for both the East and West Series.) | Iowa Speedway, Newton, Iowa | July 28 |
| 10 | NAPA Auto Parts 150 presented by Toyota | Evergreen Speedway, Monroe, Washington | August 12 |
| 11 | Clint Newell Toyota 150 presented by NAPA Auto Parts | Douglas County Speedway, Roseburg, Oregon | August 26 |
| 12 | NAPA Auto Parts Idaho 208 presented by Perfect Hydration and Lights Out | Meridian Speedway, Meridian, Idaho | September 30 |
| 13 | Toyota/NAPA Auto Parts 150 presented by TriCo Welding Supply | All American Speedway, Roseville, California | October 14 |
| 14 | West Coast Stock Car Hall of Fame Championship 150 presented by NAPA Auto Parts | Kern County Raceway Park, Bakersfield, California | November 4 |

NAPA 500 Challenge (Note: The first four races were part of the NAPA 500 Challenge, with a $100,000 reward to anyone who won all four races, $10,000 to anyone who finished in the Top 3 in all four races, $5,000 for a Top 5 classification in all four races and $1,000 for a Top 10 classification in all four races.)

== Results and standings ==
=== Races ===
| No. | Race | Pole position | Most laps led | Winning driver | Manufacturer |
|---|---|---|---|---|---|
| 1 | NAPA Auto Parts Tucson 150 | Todd Gilliland | Chris Eggleston | Chris Eggleston | Toyota |
| 2 | NAPA Auto Parts 150 | Todd Gilliland | Michael Self | Todd Gilliland | Toyota |
| 3 | NAPA Auto Parts Twin 100s | Todd Gilliland | Todd Gilliland | Todd Gilliland | Toyota |
| 4 | NAPA Auto Parts Twin 100s | Todd Gilliland^{1} | Todd Gilliland | Todd Gilliland | Toyota |
| 5 | Toyota/NAPA Auto Parts 150 | Todd Gilliland | Todd Gilliland | Todd Gilliland | Toyota |
| 6 | Sunrise Ford 150 presented by Pinnacle Peak Steakhouse | Chris Eggleston | Chris Eggleston | Chris Eggleston | Toyota |
| 7 | NAPA Auto Parts/Toyota 150 | Chris Eggleston | Todd Gilliland | Chris Eggleston | Toyota |
| 8 | Carneros 200 | Will Rodgers | Will Rodgers | Kevin Harvick | Ford |
| 9 | Casey's General Store 150 presented by Vatterott College | Derek Kraus | Todd Gilliland | Todd Gilliland | Toyota |
| 10 | NAPA Auto Parts 150 presented by Toyota | Chris Eggleston | Chris Eggleston | Chris Eggleston | Toyota |
| 11 | Clint Newell Toyota 150 presented by NAPA Auto Parts | Chris Eggleston | Chris Eggleston | Todd Gilliland | Toyota |
| 12 | NAPA Auto Parts Idaho 208 presented by Perfect Hydration and Lights Out | Todd Gilliland | Todd Gilliland | Michael Self | Ford |
| 13 | Toyota/NAPA Auto Parts 150 presented by TriCo Welding Supply | Michael Self | Michael Self | Michael Self | Ford |
| 14 | West Coast Stock Car Hall of Fame Championship 150 presented by NAPA Auto Parts | Todd Gilliland | Dillon Bassett | Derek Kraus | Toyota |

Notes

- ^{1} – Starting grid was set by the fastest lap times from the first NAPA Auto Parts Twin 100 race.

=== Drivers' championship ===
(key) Bold – Pole position awarded by time. Italics – Pole position set by final practice results or Owners' points. * – Most laps led.

| Pos | Driver | TUC | KER | IRW | IRW | SPO | ORG | CNS | SON | IOW | EVG | DCO | MER | AAS | KER | Points |
|---|---|---|---|---|---|---|---|---|---|---|---|---|---|---|---|---|
| 1 | Todd Gilliland | **2** | **1** | **1*** | **1*** | **1*** | 6 | 3* | 6 | 1* | 12 | 1 | **2*** | 2 | **2** | 610 |
| 2 | Chris Eggleston | 1* | 4 | 2 | 2 | 3 | **1*** | **1** | 10 | 3 | **1*** | **2*** | 7 | 3 | 20 | 581 |
| 3 | Derek Kraus **(R)** | 6 | 2 | 18 | 4 | 2 | 16 | 2 | 5 | **11** | 11 | 3 | 5 | 4 | 1 | 533 |
| 4 | Michael Self | | 6* | 6 | 3 | 5 | 8 | 8 | 4 | 6 | 4 | 7 | 1 | **1*** | 4 | 522 |
| 5 | Will Rodgers **(R)** | 5 | 3 | 5 | 5 | 19 | 20 | 9 | **2*** | 8 | 2 | 4 | 3 | 5 | 8 | 520 |
| 6 | Todd Souza | 22 | 10 | 11 | 10 | 12 | 3 | 10 | 8 | 18 | 8 | 8 | 4 | 11 | 13 | 468 |
| 7 | Julia Landauer | 12 | 12 | 10 | 6 | 7 | 19 | 6 | 23 | 17 | 6 | 5 | 9 | 21 | 12 | 451 |
| 8 | Nicole Behar | 10 | 7 | 4 | 8 | 6 | 17 | 17 | 25 | 27 | 3 | 12 | 20 | 6 | 10 | 444 |
| 9 | Kody Vanderwal **(R)** | 8 | 9 | 14 | 15 | 10 | 4 | 5 | 15 | 34 | 14 | 15 | 6 | 9 | 18 | 440 |
| 10 | Blaine Perkins | 11 | 8 | 7 | 9 | 18 | 11 | 20 | 7 | 21 | 16 | 17 | 8 | 8 | 19 | 436 |
| 11 | Matt Levin | 13 | 15 | 9 | 12 | 11 | 9 | 11 | 14 | 19 | 7 | 10 | 21 | 12 | 25 | 428 |
| 12 | Ron Norman | 14 | 14 | 12 | 11 | 20 | 13 | 7 | 22 | 23 | 9 | 18 | 11 | 16 | 24 | 402 |
| 13 | Takuma Koga | 16 | 19 | 16 | 19 | 14 | 5 | 16 | 21 | 29 | 18 | 11 | 12 | 14 | 17 | 389 |
| 14 | Jesse Iwuji | 20 | 16 | 21 | 18 | 15 | 14 | 14 | 31 | 31 | 17 | 13 | 13 | 19 | 16 | 358 |
| 15 | Stafford Smith | | | 19 | 14 | 16 | 18 | 19 | 24 | 24 | 10 | 14 | 10 | 13 | 14 | 333 |
| 16 | Bill Kann | 18 | 17 | 13 | 17 | | 7 | 21 | | 28 | | | | 18 | 21 | 236 |
| 17 | Rich DeLong III | 19 | 13 | 15 | 16 | 22 | 12 | 13 | 27 | | | | | | | 215 |
| 18 | John Wood | | | | | | 10 | 18 | 29 | 32 | 15 | 20 | 15 | 20 | | 193 |
| 19 | Garret Archer **(R)** | 3 | 18 | 3 | 7 | 4 | | | | | | | | | | 185 |
| 20 | Dan Phillippi **(R)** | 17 | 21 | 17 | 20 | | | 12 | | | | 16 | | | | 161 |
| 21 | Trevor Cristiani **(R)** | 15 | | | | | | | | | | 9 | 19 | 15 | 26 | 137 |
| 22 | Johnny Borneman III | | 11 | 8 | 13 | | | | 18 | | | | | | | 126 |
| 23 | Andrew Engberson **(R)** | | | | | 13 | 15 | | | | 13 | 19 | | | | 116 |
| 24 | Max Tullman **(R)** | | | | | | | | | | | | 17 | 10 | 9 | 96 |
| 25 | Salvatore Iovino **(R)** | 21 | 20 | Wth | Wth | 21 | | | | | | | | | | 92 |
| 26 | David Mayhew | | 5 | | | | | | 3 | | | | | | | 80 |
| 27 | Sheldon Creed **(R)** | | | | | | 2 | | 9 | | | | | | | 78 |
| 28 | Riley Herbst | 9 | Wth | Wth | Wth | | | | | | | | | | 3 | 76 |
| 29 | Buddy Shepherd **(R)** | | | | | | | | | | | 6 | | | 7 | 75 |
| 30 | Brandon Schilling **(R)** | 7 | 22 | | | | | | | | | | | | | 59 |
| 31 | Derek Thorn | | | | | | | | 28 | | | | | | 6 | 54 |
| 32 | Rudy Vanderwal **(R)** | | | | | | | 15 | | | 19 | | | | | 54 |
| 33 | Josh Fanopoulos **(R)** | | | | | | | | | | | | 16 | 22 | | 50 |
| 34 | Andrew Tuttle **(R)** | | | | | 17 | 21 | | | | | | | | | 50 |
| 35 | Zack St. Onge **(R)** | | | | | | | | | | | 21 | 18 | | | 49 |
| 36 | Kevin Harvick | | | | | | | | 1 | | | | | | | 47 |
| 37 | Dan O'Donnell **(R)** | | | 20 | DNS^{1} | | | | | | | | | | | 47 |
| 38 | Dillon Bassett | | | | | | | | | 20^{2} | | | | | 5* | 41 |
| 39 | Justin Funkhouser | 24 | 23 | | | | | | | | | | | | | 41 |
| 40 | Zane Smith **(R)** | 4 | | | | | | | | | | | | | | 40 |
| 41 | Gracin Raz | | | | | | | 4 | | | | | | | | 40 |
| 42 | Tayler Riddle **(R)** | | | | | | | | | | 5 | | | | | 39 |
| 43 | Jonas Fors **(R)** | | | | | | | | | | | | | 23 | 27 | 38 |
| 44 | Cole Moore **(R)** | | | | | | | | | | | | | 7 | | 37 |
| 45 | Owen Riddle **(R)** | | | | | 8 | | | | | | | | | | 36 |
| 46 | Braeden Havens | | | | | 9 | | | | | | | | | | 35 |
| 47 | Daniel Suárez | | | | | | | | 11 | | | | | | | 33 |
| 48 | Rod Johnson Jr. **(R)** | | | | | | | | | | | | | | 11 | 33 |
| 49 | Carlos Vieira | | | | | | | | 12 | | | | | | | 32 |
| 50 | Tim Spurgeon | | | | | | | | 13 | | | | | | | 31 |
| 51 | Tyler Fabozzi **(R)** | | | | | | | | | | | | 14 | | | 30 |
| 52 | Davey Hamilton Jr. **(R)** | | | | | | | | | | | | | | 15 | 29 |
| 53 | Scott Ivie | | | | | | | | 16 | | | | | | | 28 |
| 54 | Dave Smith | | | | | | | | 17 | | | | | | | 27 |
| 55 | Hollis Thackeray **(R)** | | | | | | | | | | | | | 17 | | 27 |
| 56 | Rodd Kneeland **(R)** | | | | | | | | 19 | | | | | | | 25 |
| 57 | Will Gallaher **(R)** | | | | | | | | 20 | | | | | | | 24 |
| 58 | Jerry de Weerdt **(R)** | | | | | | | | | | | | | | 22 | 22 |
| 59 | Bobby Hillis Jr. | 23 | | Wth | Wth | | | | | | | | | | | 21 |
| 60 | Ronnie Bassett Jr. | | | | | | | | | 9^{2} | | | | | 23 | 21 |
| 61 | Ryan Blaney | | | | | | | | 26 | | | | | | | 18 |
| 62 | Jim Inglebright | | | | | | | | 30 | | | | | | | 14 |
| 63 | Kevin O'Connell | | | | | | | | DNS^{1} | | | | | | | 12 |
| 64 | Bryant Barnhill **(R)** | | | | | | | | | 33 | | | | | | 11 |
| | Vanessa Robinson **(R)** | Wth | | | | | | | | | | | | | | 0 |
Drivers ineligible for K&N Pro Series West points
| | Chase Purdy **(R)** | | | | | | | | | 2 | | | | | | |
| | Harrison Burton | | | | | | | | | 4 | | | | | | |
| | Chase Cabre **(R)** | | | | | | | | | 5 | | | | | | |
| | Ben Kennedy | | | | | | | | | 7 | | | | | | |
| | Jesse Little | | | | | | | | | 10 | | | | | | |
| | Rubén García Jr. | | | | | | | | | 12 | | | | | | |
| | Tyler Dippel | | | | | | | | | 13 | | | | | | |
| | Collin Cabre | | | | | | | | | 14 | | | | | | |
| | Reid Wilson **(R)** | | | | | | | | | 15 | | | | | | |
| | Jay Beasley | | | | | | | | | 16 | | | | | | |
| | Jeff Green | | | | | | | | | 22 | | | | | | |
| | Brandon Oakley **(R)** | | | | | | | | | 25 | | | | | | |
| | Vinnie Miller **(R)** | | | | | | | | | 26 | | | | | | |
| | Trey Hutchens | | | | | | | | | 30 | | | | | | |
| Pos | Driver | TUC | KER | IRW | IRW | SPO | ORG | CNS | SON | IOW | EVG | DCO | MER | AAS | KER | Points |

Notes

- ^{1} – Dan O'Donnell and Kevin O'Connell received championship points, despite the fact that they did not start the race.
- ^{2} – Scored points towards the K&N Pro Series East.

== See also ==
- 2017 Monster Energy NASCAR Cup Series
- 2017 NASCAR Xfinity Series
- 2017 NASCAR Camping World Truck Series
- 2017 NASCAR K&N Pro Series East
- 2017 NASCAR Whelen Modified Tour
- 2017 NASCAR Pinty's Series
- 2017 NASCAR PEAK Mexico Series
- 2017 NASCAR Whelen Euro Series
