= Stafford Smith =

American racing driver

- Nationality: (United States) American
- Born: June 18, 1998 (age 28) Eagle, Idaho

ARCA Menards Series West career
- Debut season: 2016
- Current team: Kart Idaho Racing
- Car number: 21
- Engine: Ford
- Crew chief: Mike Holleran
- Starts: 24
- Championships: 0
- Wins: 0
- Poles: 0

Previous series
- NASCAR K&N Pro Series East
- Statistics up to date as of March 26, 2022.

Stafford Smith (born June 18, 1998) is an American professional stock car racing driver. He last competed part-time in the ARCA Menards Series West, driving the No. 21 Ford Fusion for Kart Idaho Racing.

== Racing career ==
=== ARCA Menards Series West ===
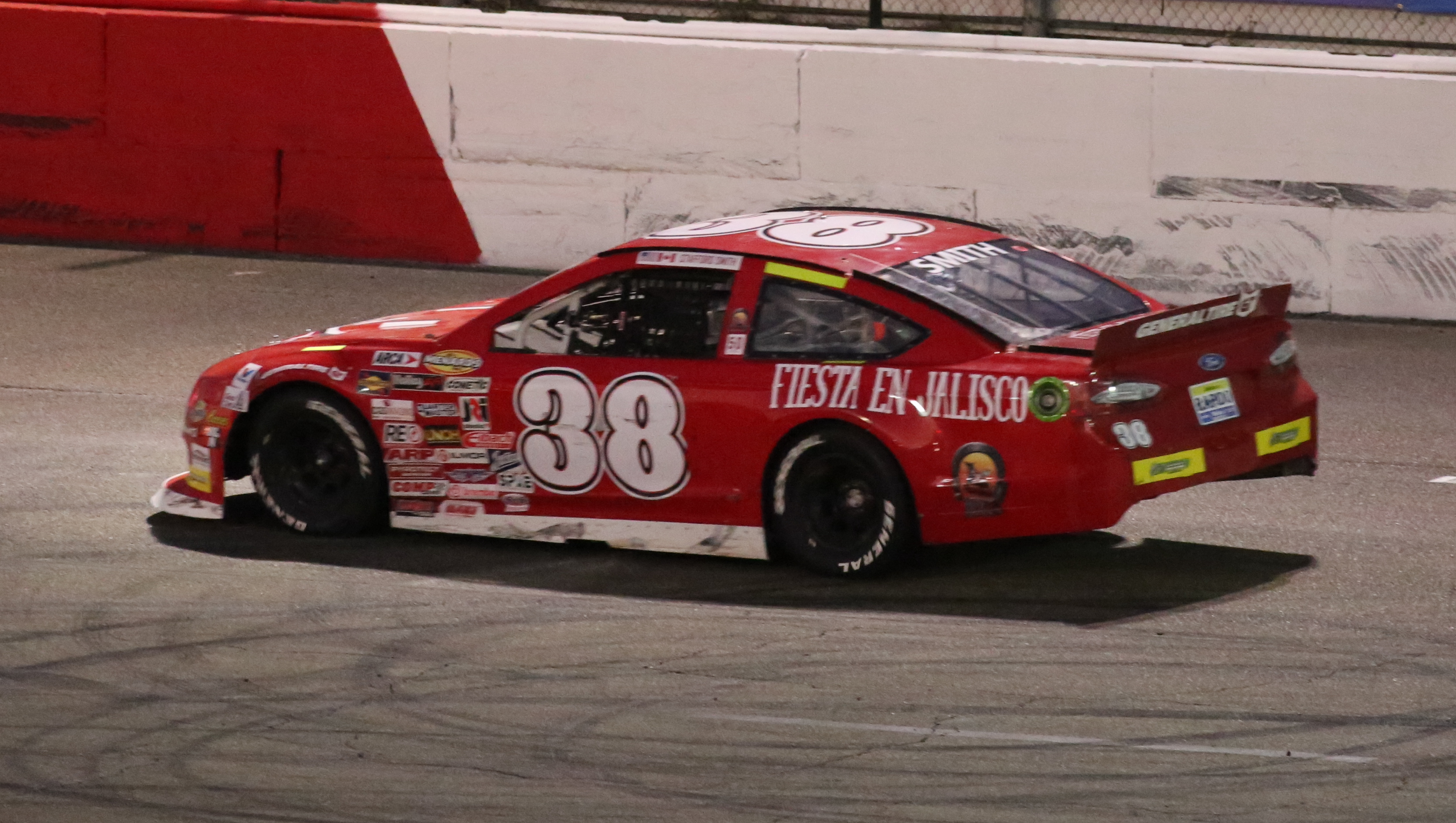
Smith's car at All American Speedway in 2021

Smith made his ARCA Menards Series West debut in 2016 (then the NASCAR K&N Pro Series West) at Tucson Speedway, finishing just outside the top-ten in 11th. Smith returned at Colorado National Speedway, finishing 11th as well. Over nine races run in the season, Smith collected two top-ten finishes, coming at Utah Motorsports Campus (tenth) and at his home track, Meridian Speedway (seventh). In 2017, Smith ran all but two races. Smith once again collected two top-ten finishes in 2017, at Evergreen Speedway (tenth) and at Meridian (tenth). Smith did not return to the series until 2021. He ran three races at Portland International Raceway, the Las Vegas Motor Speedway Bullring, and All-American Speedway, finishing eighth, 12th, and sixth respectively. Smith will return for the 2022 season, beginning at Irwindale Speedway. Originally meant to be in the No. 08, but was renumbered to the No. 21.

=== NASCAR K&N Pro Series East ===
Smith ran three races in the 2017 NASCAR K&N Pro Series East season. He debuted at Berlin Raceway finishing 15th. He finished 16th at Thompson Speedway and 17th at New Hampshire Motor Speedway.

== Motorsports career results ==
=== K&N Pro Series East ===
NASCAR K&N Pro Series East results
Year	Team	No.	Make	1	2	3	4	5	6	7	8	9	10	11	12	13	14	NKNPSEC	Pts	Ref
2017	Patriot Motorsports Group	36	Toyota	NSM	GRE	BRI	SBO	SBO	MEM	BLN; 15	TMP; 16							24th	84	
2017	Patriot Motorsports Group	32	Chevy									NHA; 17	IOW	GLN	LGY	NJM	DOV	24th	84	

=== ARCA Menards Series West ===
ARCA Menards Series West results
Year	Team	No.	Make	1	2	3	4	5	6	7	8	9	10	11	12	13	14	AMSWC	Pts	Ref
2016	Mike Holleran	38	Toyota	IRW	KCR	TUS; 11	OSS	CNS; 11	SON; 28	SLS; 13	IOW	EVG				MER; 7		13th	263	
2016	Bob Wood	14	Ford										DCS; 19					13th	263	
2016	Mike Holleran	38	Ford											UMC; 14	UMC; 10		AAS; 20	13th	263	
2017	Kart Idaho Racing	30	Ford	TUS	KCR	IRW; 19	IRW; 14	SPO; 16	OSS; 18	CNS; 19			EVG; 10	DCS; 14	MER; 10	AAS; 13	KCR; 14	15th	333	
2017	Mike Holleran	38	Ford								SON; 24							15th	333	
2017	Kart Idaho Racing	39	Ford									IOW; 24						15th	333	
2021	Kart Idaho Racing	08	Ford	PHO	SON	IRW	CNS	IRW	PIR; 8									17th	106	
2021	Kart Idaho Racing	38	Ford							LVS; 12	AAS; 6	PHO						17th	106	
2022	Kart Idaho Racing	08	Ford	PHO	IRW; Wth													57th	30	
2022	Lowden Motorsports	21	Toyota		IRW; 14	KCR	PIR	SON	IRW	EVG	PIR	AAS	LVS	PHO				57th	30	
