= Chris Eggleston =

American racing driver (born 1989)

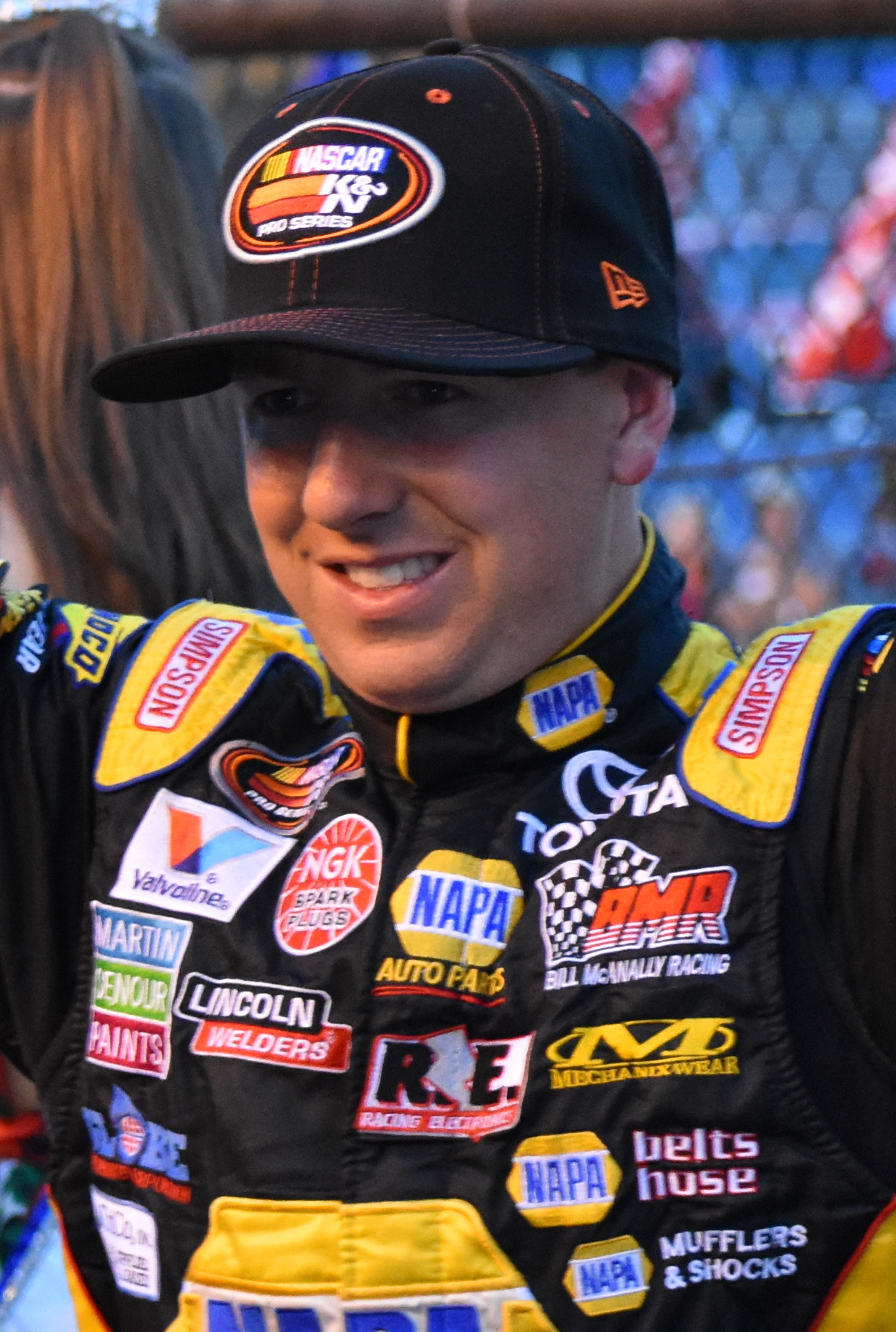
- Eggleston at Evergreen Speedway in 2017
- Born: March 27, 1989 (age 37) Erie, Colorado, U.S.

NASCAR K&N Pro Series West career
- Debut season: 2011
- Current team: Bill McAnally Racing
- Car number: 99
- Engine: Toyota
- Crew chief: Roger Bracken
- Former teams: Bob Wood Racing
- Starts: 46
- Wins: 8
- Poles: 3
- Best finish: 1st in 2015

Previous series
- 2010–11, 2014: NASCAR Camping World Truck Series

Championship titles
- 2009: ASA Late Model Series Northern Division

NASCAR FedEx Freight Truck Series career
- 10 races run over 3 years
- 2018 position: 36th
- Best finish: 36th (2018)
- First race: 2010 Kroger 250 (Martinsville)
- Last race: 2018 World of Westgate 200 (Las Vegas)
Wins	Top tens	Poles
0	1	0
- Statistics up to date as of September 14, 2018.

Chris Eggleston (born March 27, 1989) is an American former professional stock car racing driver. He last competed part-time in the NASCAR Camping World Truck Series, driving the Nos. 17 and 54 Toyota Tundras for DGR-Crosley. He previously competed in the NASCAR K&N Pro Series West, where he won the 2015 championship.

== Racing career ==
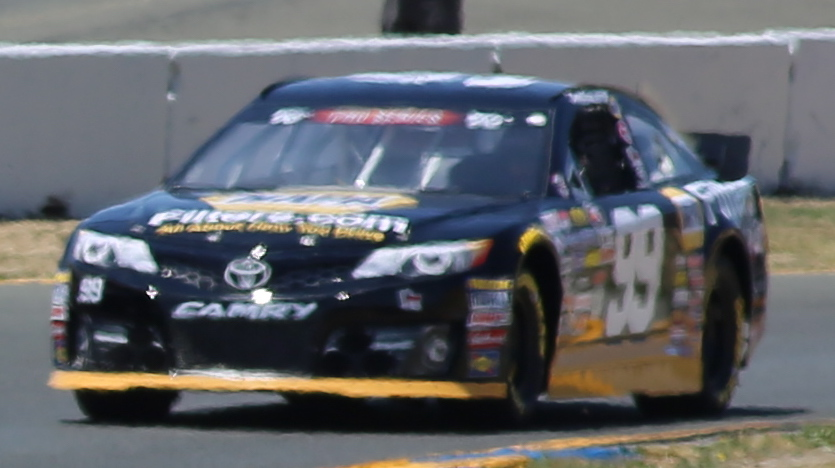
Eggleston during the 2017 Carneros 200 at Sonoma Raceway.

Eggleston's first year of racing was 2009 and was immediately successful as he won the ASA Late Model Series Northern Division championship driving for 5K Motorsports. He managed to win two out of ten races. He also competed in the ASA Late Model Series Challenge Division and got one podium and one pole position and became fourth in the championship. In addition, he competed in the NASCAR Whelen All-American Series and managed to become 15th in his home state Colorado.

In 2010, Eggleston made a big step in his career driving five races in the NASCAR Camping World Truck Series for the SS-Green Light Racing team. His best result of the season was an eleventh place at Martinsville Speedway.

In 2011, Eggleston drove just a few races in three different championships: the PASS South, the ASA Midwest Tour and the NASCAR K&N Pro Series West. He did not enter any registered race events and championships in 2012 and 2013. He returned to racing in 2014. He made his return in the NASCAR Camping World Truck Series, again for the SS-Green Light Racing team, and became 19th in the American Ethanol 200, his only NCWTS race that year. He became 24th in the championship in the NASCAR K&N Pro Series West after winning one of the three races he entered and he also raced in the ARCA/CRA Super Series. In 2015, he ran full-time in the NASCAR K&N Pro Series West with the Bill McAnally Racing team, the same team as in 2014. That year, he won two races and won the championship.

In 2018, it was announced that Eggleston would make his return to the NASCAR Camping World Truck Series with David Gilliland’s new team, DGR-Crosley, driving the No. 17 truck part-time starting with Charlotte. However, Eggleston moved to the No. 54 truck due to rain.

== Motorsports career results ==
=== NASCAR ===
(key) (Bold – Pole position awarded by qualifying time. Italics – Pole position earned by points standings or practice time. * – Most laps led. ** – All laps led.)

==== Camping World Truck Series ====
NASCAR Camping World Truck Series results
Year	Team	No.	Make	1	2	3	4	5	6	7	8	9	10	11	12	13	14	15	16	17	18	19	20	21	22	23	24	25	NCWTC	Pts	Ref
2010	SS-Green Light Racing	21	Chevy	DAY	ATL	MAR; 11	NSH; 24	KAN; 30	DOV	CLT; 29	TEX	MCH																	51st	496	
2010	SS-Green Light Racing	21	Dodge										IOW; 14	GTW	IRP	POC	NSH	DAR	BRI	CHI	KEN	NHA	LVS	MAR	TAL	TEX	PHO	HOM	51st	496	
2011	Winfield Motorsports	27	Dodge	DAY; DNQ	PHO; DNQ	DAR	MAR	NSH	DOV	CLT	KAN	TEX	KEN	IOW	NSH	IRP	POC	MCH	BRI	ATL	CHI	NHA	KEN	LVS	TAL	MAR	TEX	HOM	104th	0	
2014	SS-Green Light Racing	08	Chevy	DAY	MAR	KAN	CLT	DOV	TEX	GTW	KEN	IOW; 19	ELD	POC	MCH	BRI	MSP	CHI	NHA	LVS	TAL	MAR	TEX	PHO	HOM				68th	26	
2018	DGR-Crosley	54	Toyota	DAY	ATL	LVS	MAR	DOV	KAN	CLT; 13	TEX; 14	IOW	GTW	CHI							LVS; 10	TAL	MAR	TEX	PHO	HOM			36th	100	
2018	DGR-Crosley	17	Toyota												KEN; 11	ELD	POC	MCH	BRI	MSP									36th	100	

==== K&N Pro Series West ====
NASCAR K&N Pro Series West results
Year	Car owner	No.	Make	1	2	3	4	5	6	7	8	9	10	11	12	13	14	NKNPSWC	Pts	Ref
2011	Bob Wood	14	Toyota	PHO	AAS	MMP	IOW	LVS	SON	IRW	EVG	PIR	CNS; 11	MRP	SPO	AAS	PHO	78th	130	
2014	Bill McAnally Racing	99	Toyota	PHO	IRW	S99	IOW	KCR	SON	SLS	CNS; 1*	IOW; 25	EVG	KCR	MMP	AAS		24th	109	
2014	Mike Naake	25	Toyota														PHO; 22	24th	109	
2015	Bill McAnally Racing	99	Toyota	KCR; 5	IRW; 1*	TUS; 9	IOW; 15	SHA; 1	SON; 13	SLS; 11	IOW; 16	EVG; 3	CNS; 3	MER; 4	AAS; 3	PHO; 11		1st	511	
2016	Bill McAnally Racing	50	Toyota	IRW; 3	KCR; 5	TUS; 3	OSS; 1	CNS; 1*	SON; 26	**SLS**; 3*	IOW; 25	EVG; 2	DCS; 7	MMP; 21	MMP; 19	MER; 9	AAS; 2	6th	511	
2017	Bill McAnally Racing	99	Toyota	TUS; 1*	KCR; 4	IRW; 2	IRW; 2	SPO; 3	**OSS**; 1*	**CNS**; 1	SON; 10	IOW; 3	**EVG**; 1**	**DCS**; 2*	MER; 7	AAS; 3	KCR; 20	2nd	581	
2018	Bill McAnally Racing	50	Toyota	KCR	TUS	TUS	OSS	CNS	SON	DCS	IOW	EVG	GTW	LVS	MER	AAS; 12	KCR	44th	33	

^{*} Season still in progress
^{1} Ineligible for series points

Sporting positions
Preceded by Greg Pursley	NASCAR K&N Pro Series West Champion; 2015	Succeeded by Todd Gilliland
