= Soap Box Derby =

Youth racing competition

International Soap Box Derby
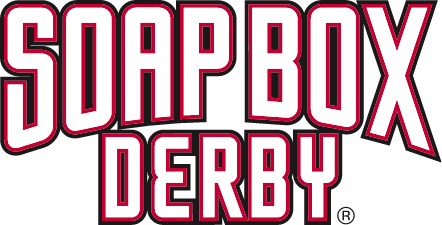
- Sport: Gravity racing
- Abbreviation: ISBD, FEAASBD
- Founded: 1934; 92 years ago
- Headquarters: Derby Downs, Akron, Ohio, US
- President: Dennis VanFossen, Jr.
- Chairman: Bret Treier
- Chairperson: Nathan Sargent (Vice chairman)
- CEO: Dennis VanFossen, Jr.
- Secretary: Patricia Roy
- Operating income: $2,781,368 (2022)
- Sponsor: FirstEnergy (premier sponsor)

Official website
- soapboxderby.org
- Other key staff: Duane Burkhammer (Shipping); Jodi Busch (Product Sales and Finance Manager); Linda Hubbell (Education Director); Brad Kappler (Events Manager); Heather Morrow (Director of Programs and Events); Emma Rice (Marketing Manager); Shawn Tittle (Race Programs Manager)

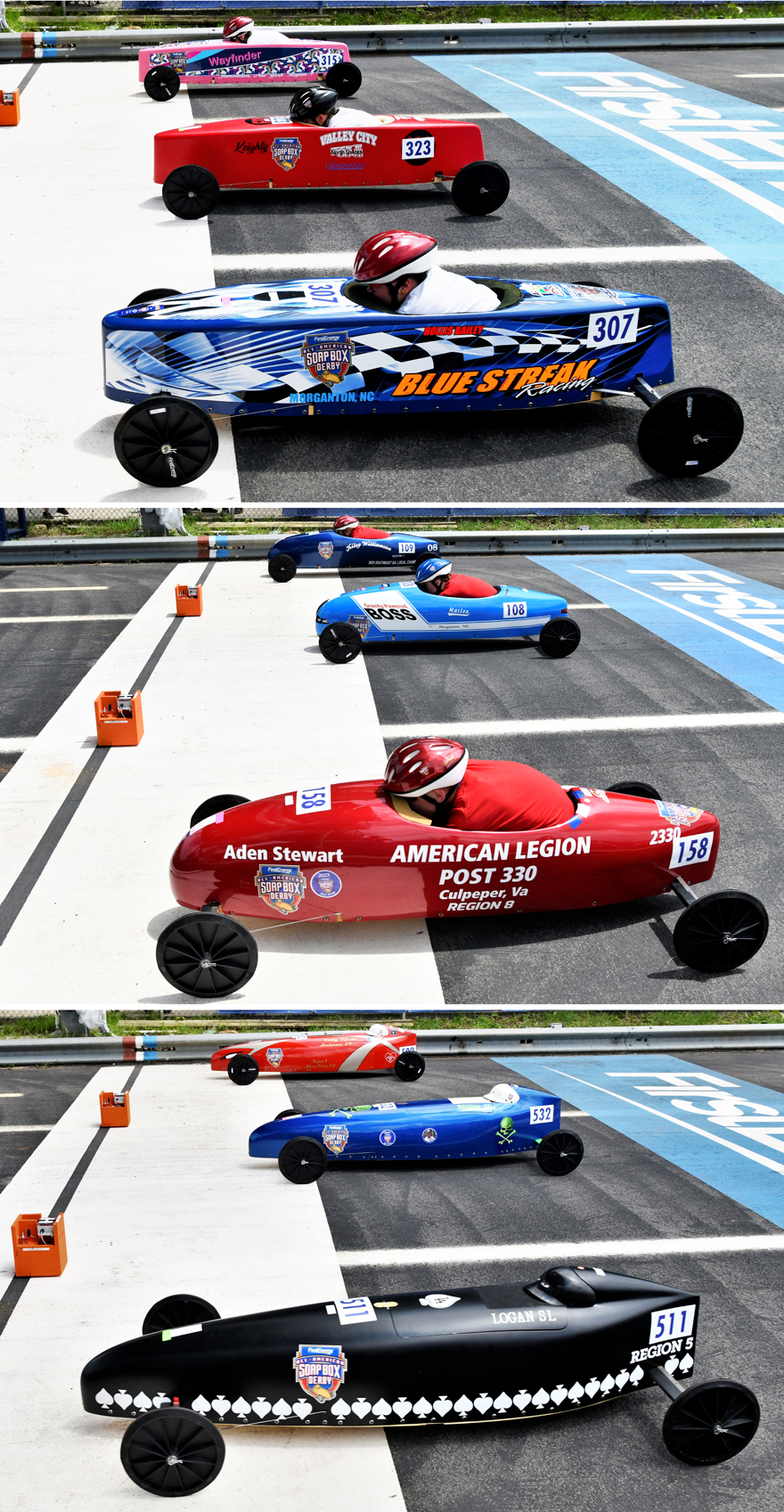
The 85th running of the FirstEnergy All-American Soap Box Derby Championship in Akron, Ohio in 2023. Photos (top to bottom) show the three official divisions: Stock, Super Stock and Masters.

The Soap Box Derby is a youth-oriented gravity racer event founded in 1934 in the United States by Myron Scott (a photojournalist native to Dayton, Ohio), employed by the Dayton Daily News, and preceded by events such as Kid Auto Races at Venice in 1914. Proclaimed "the greatest amateur racing event in the world", the program culminates each July at the FirstEnergy All-American Soap Box Derby World Championship held at Derby Downs in Akron, Ohio, with winners from their local communities traveling from across the US, Canada, Germany, and Japan to compete. 2024 marked the 86th running of the All-American since its inception in 1934 in Dayton, Ohio, having missed four years (1942–1945) during World War II and one (2020) during the COVID-19 pandemic. Cars competing in the program race downhill, propelled by gravity alone.

The Soap Box Derby expanded quickly across the US from the very beginning, bolstered largely by a generous financial campaign by its national sponsor, Chevrolet Motor Company. At the same time there was enthusiastic support from coast to coast from numerous local newspapers that published aggressively during the summer months when races were held, with stories boasting of their own community races and of their champion traveling to Akron with dreams of capturing a national title and hometown glory. In 1936 the All-American had its own purpose-built track constructed at what is now Derby Downs, with some communities across America following suit with tracks of their own.

Its greatest years occurred during the 1950s and 1960s when spectator turnout at the All-American reached 100,000, and racer participation was at an all-time high. From the very beginning, technical and car-design innovation happened rapidly, so derby officials drafted ways of governing the sport so that it did not become too hazardous as speed records were being challenged. At Derby Downs the track length was shortened twice to slow the cars down.

The 1970s brought significant changes, beginning with the introduction of girls to the sport in 1971, although a girl had competed in the event's local predecessor in 1934 and placed second. The following year Chevrolet dropped its sponsorship, sending Derby Downs into a tailspin that threatened its future. Racer enrollment plummeted the following year. In 1973 a scandal hit Derby Downs with the discovery that their world champion had cheated, and was thus disqualified, further exacerbating the uncertainty of the future. In 1975 Karren Stead won the world championship, the first of many girls who would go on to claim the title. Finally, there was the derby's decision to divide the competition with the introduction of the Junior Division kit cars in 1976.

As fiscal challenges continued, the derby instituted new guidelines by redrafting the official race divisions into three: stock, super stock and masters. With them came prefabricated fiberglass kit racers which kids could now purchase, to appeal to a new generation of racers uncomfortable with constructing their own cars from scratch, as well as to help the derby effectively meet its financial obligations. Leading into the 21st century the Soap Box Derby has continued to expand with the inclusion of the Rally Program racers at the All-American in 1993, the creation of the Ultimate Speed Challenge in 2004 and the Legacy Division in 2019.

== Introduction ==
The Soap Box Derby, promoted as "the greatest amateur racing event in the world," is a largely volunteer-driven, family-oriented sporting activity for youth conducted across the US and around the world. Local or regional races are held yearly, with winners from each sent to compete at the All-American Soap Box Derby World Championship, officially the FirstEnergy All-American Soap Box Derby World Championship, which occurs every July at Derby Downs in Akron, Ohio. The governing body of the championship is the International Soap Box Derby, or ISBD, run by a paid administrative staff headquartered at Derby Downs, a term also used metonymically to describe said organization.

The name Soap Box Derby (Note: Popular during the Great Depression, a soapbox car was a hand-built, kid-sized push car or racer constructed from anything like tin plate and bits of discarded wood crate mounted to a pair or set of wheels that kids rode around on.) is a registered trademark, and used to identify the sport overall, with those actively involved referring to it simply as "Derby." The official name, FirstEnergy All-American Soap Box Derby, is used solely to identify the annual world championship race itself, and referred to similarly as "the All-American."

Eligibility to race in the Soap Box Derby is open to anyone aged 7 through 20, with participants divided by age into three official divisions, with a specific car design assigned for each: stock, the entry level division for ages 7–13, super stock, for mid-level kids ages 9–18, and masters, the senior level for ages 10–20 and a design where the occupant rides in the fully reclined position. Cars come un-assembled in kits purchased from the ISBD, the only visibly common component of all three designs being the official wheels sets which are available for purchase as well.

While working with a mentor is permitted, kids are expected to assemble the cars themselves to develop the skills necessary for the car to pass inspection before they are qualified to race.

== Beginnings ==
Kids playing on home-made scooters and go karts in the 1930s was not an unfamiliar sight in the streets of America, and racing in organized events was an inevitable outcome of it. As early as 1904 Germany conducted its first soapbox race for kids, and in 1914 there was the Junior Vanderbilt Cup in Venice, California that held a kids race as well. (Note: This event was captured on film in the 1914 American silent short Kid Auto Races at Venice, starring Charlie Chaplin in his first Little Tramp character appearance in cinema. It featured an organized event that saw kids racing down a tall wooden ramp before a large crowd.)

The Soap Box Derby story began on June 10, 1933, when six boys were racing homemade push carts in Dayton, Ohio, among them William Condit, whose father suggested they have a race and that he would contact the local newspaper to have them cover it. The other participants were Dean Gattwood, Tracey Geiger Jr., Robert Gravett, James P. Hobstetter and William Pickrel Jr.. Of the six, Condit won that race, with Gravett taking second.

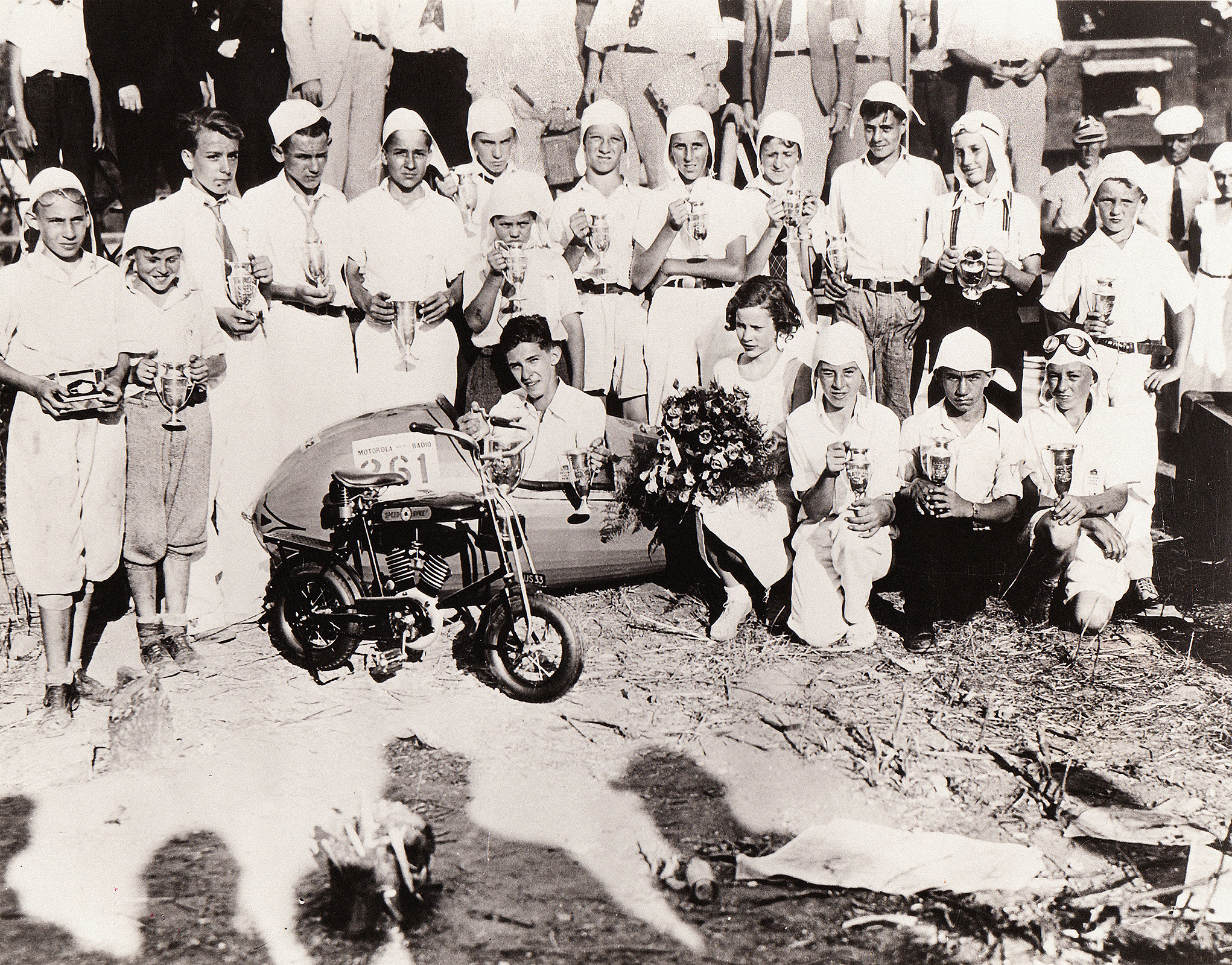
1933 Dayton City-wide Soap Box Race (Note: Referred to in 1933 as "Soap Box Race," not "Soap Box Derby," which started in 1934) at day's end, with champion Randy Custer (seated in car) and runner-up Alice Johnson (with flowers)

Myron Scott, a 25-year-old photojournalist for the Dayton Daily News looking for ideas for its Sunday Picture Page, was one of two photographers that got the call, and accepting the assignment ventured out to investigate. Seeing the appeal of a kids story like this, he asked the boys to return in two weeks with more of their friends so he could host a race of his own. When they did, nineteen showed up, bringing with them racers made of packing crates, soap boxes, sheets of tin, and whatever else they could find. The race was held on Big Hill Road in Oakwood, a south-side neighborhood of Dayton, with a crowd of onlookers coming to watch. Seizing on a publicity opportunity, Scott decided to plan an even bigger city-wide event with the support of his employer, the Dayton Daily News, which recognized the hope-inspiring and goodwill nature of the story—especially during the Great Depression. It posted advertisements of it almost daily to stir interest, and included an application which stipulated "for anything on four wheels that will coast" for the kids to fill out. A date was set for August 19, 1933, to host a parade, the race to occur a day after, and the location chosen as Burkhardt Hill, a straight, westbound slope on Burdhardt Ave (Note: 1st venue: Burkhardt Hill, Dayton, Ohio39°45′38″N 84°08′34″W) east of Downtown Dayton.

On the appointed weekend, a turnout of 460 kids—along with 40,000 onlookers—caught everyone by surprise, and Scott knew he was onto something big. From the original 460 cars, 362 were deemed safe enough to participate, including Robert Gravett, the only boy from the original Oakwood six that made an appearance. At day's end, 16-year-old Randy Custer (pictured), who also hailed from Oakwood, took the championship in his "slashing yellow comet" on three wheels, with 11-year-old Alice Johnson—who shocked many when they saw she was a girl after removing her helmet—taking runner-up.

Scott immediately set about making the race an All-American event the following year, and sought a national sponsor, selling the idea successfully to the Chevrolet Motor Company to co-sponsor with the Dayton Daily News. He was also able to induce many newspapers from coast to coast to sponsor local races on the merits that the story would increase circulation. From the photographs taken at the very first race of the six boys, he selected runner-up Robert Gravett's entry as the archetypal soap box car, and designed it into the national logo along with the now-official name, Soap Box Derby, which became a registered trademark.

=== First All-American ===
The very first All-American Soap Box Derby race was held on August 19, 1934, at the same location as the Dayton city-wide race in 1933, on a track that measured 1,980 feet (600 m). Watched by a crowd estimated at 45,000, boys from 34 cities competed in the all-day affair, with Robert Turner of Muncie, Indiana, piloting a car riding on bare metal wheels with no bearings, becoming the first All-American Champion. Charles Baer of Akron won the All-Ohio Championship, and in a separate race category called Blue Flame for boys aged 16 to 18, Eugene Franke of Dayton, piloting a scaled-down version of a professional motorized racer, took the crown.

In 1935, civic leaders from Akron, Ohio, convinced program organizers to move the event to Akron due to its central location and hilly terrain. A long, eastbound grade on Tallmadge Avenue located at the east end of the city, (Note: 2nd venue: Tallmadge Hill, Akron, Ohio 41°06′07″N 81°28′08″W) and the site of the 1934 Akron local race, was used for that year's national event, and a date was set for August 11, 1935. Scott decided to discontinue the Blue Flame race category, as turnout the previous year was low. Fifty-two champs from across the nation made the trip to Akron, greeted by a throng of 50,000 on race day, with Maurice Bale of Anderson, Indiana, in a sleek, metal-clad racer taking the top prize. One mishap was an accident that captured the public's interest, even boosting the event's profile worldwide, when a car piloted by Paul Brown of Oklahoma City, Oklahoma, went off the track and struck NBC's Graham McNamee and Tom Manning while they were broadcasting, an incident that continued being described live on the air as it happened.

=== Marketing the Derby ===
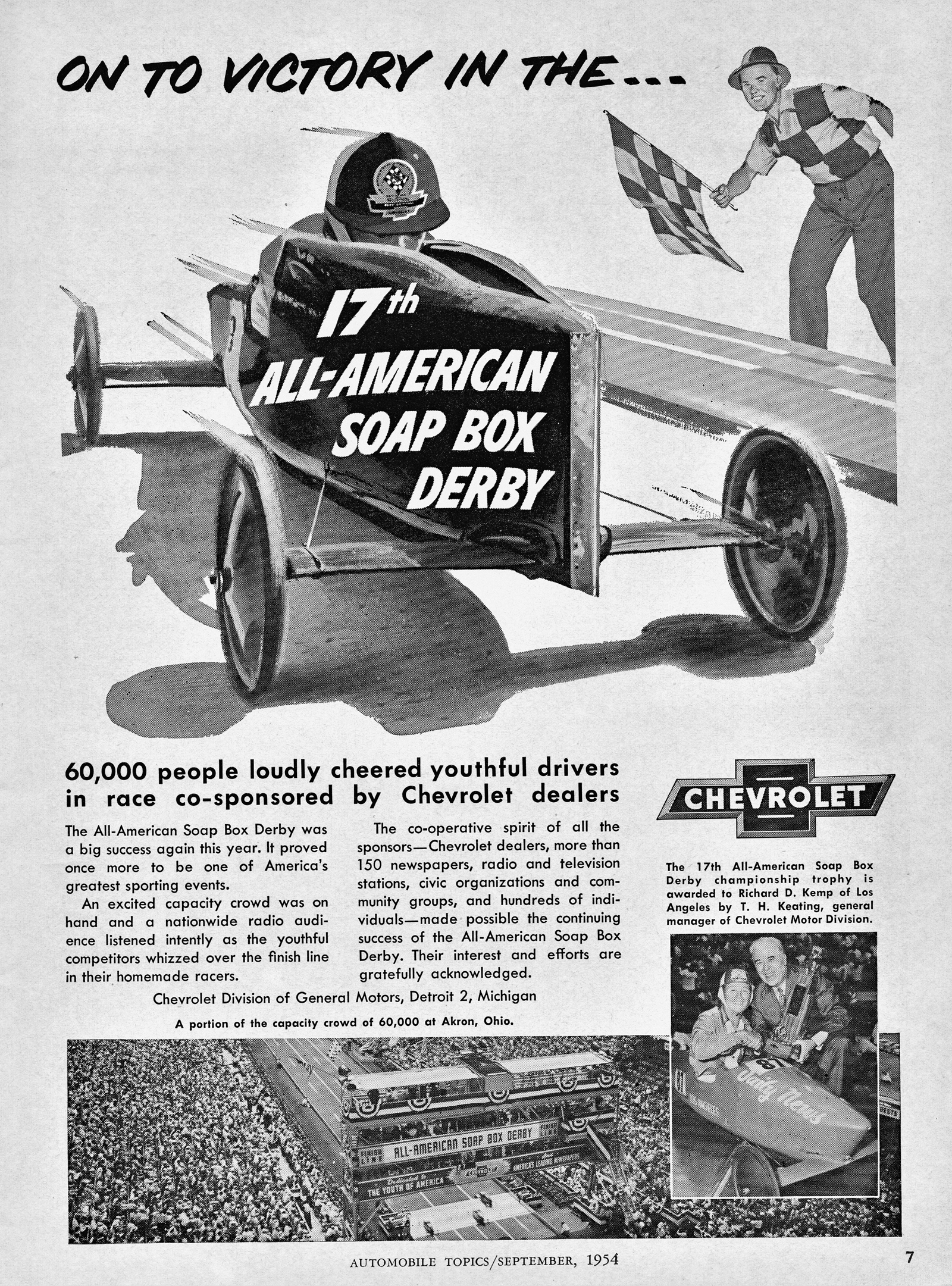
1954 magazine advertisement by Chevrolet Motor Division

The Soap Box Derby swept across America quickly during the depression with dreams of winning the All-American becoming quite popular with boys. Within a year of its inauguration, tens of thousands of them were constructing racers. The added inducement of winning a college scholarship was also a chance at a more promising future, particularly when life was a challenge for many. Print media made celebrities of Derby champs, their faces appearing on the front page of every newspaper that covered an event.

Chevrolet's campaign in promoting the Derby promulgated these ideas. However, Chevrolet's sponsoring of the All-American was ostensibly a money-making enterprise, and with the depression well underway by 1934 and programs like the WPA being implemented to bolster the economy, the idea of a kids' recreational program like the Derby—boys in cars—seemed an excellent marketing opportunity to sell its main product—cars—to their parents. During the depression, kids had little access to organized activities like team sports or television, so getting them get behind a national event like Derby was an easy sell. Chevrolet dealerships acted as agents for the derby, where kids would go to sign up and purchase wheels and axles to get started on their cars; and, since a child was usually accompanied by their parents, who waited patiently while their child filled out an application, it served as a surreptitious way of getting them to check out the latest models in the showroom.

==== Awards ====
Awards at the All-American started with the first-place silver trophy and a four-year college or university scholarship of their choice. Second and third place were awarded a brand new Chevrolet and a smaller silver trophy similar in design to the first-place award. Technical awards went to the best constructed (C.F. Kettering Trophy) and best upholstered entries, as well as the car with the best brake. At the local level, boys that won and qualified to attend the All-American were awarded the M. E. Coyle (silver) Trophy, named after Chevrolet General Manager (1933–1946) M. E. Coyle (1888–1961), and a cash prize. Beginning in 1950, they received the T. H. Keating Award plaque, named after Chevrolet Sales Manager T. H. Keating. Technical honors for cars with best construction, best upholstery, and best brake were awarded as well.

==== Awards ceremony ====
The climax of each year's All-American was the champions' victory banquet hosted by Chevrolet, a grand spectacle that culminated in an awards ceremony for the winning boys. Created as a media event, the dinner was inaugurated in 1935 at the Mayflower Hotel in downtown Akron when the city first became host to the All-American. It was eventually held at the larger Goodyear Hall gymnasium, and was attended by up to three-thousand guests. Attendees included the racers themselves, who were treated like royalty, seated on a large multi-tiered stage before an audience of family members and volunteers. Seated with them where the Derby officials and attending dignitaries who, from the podium on the highest part of the stage, handed out the awards.

=== Derby Downs ===
Because of the growing popularity of the event, a larger and more permanent home was needed, and a dedicated track was constructed in 1936. Chief among those that spearheaded the project were Bain "Shorty" Fulton, manager of Akron's Fulton Airport, and Jim Schlemmer, sports editor of the Akron Beacon Journal. A site (Note: 3rd venue: Derby Downs, Akron, Ohio 41°02′20″N 81°27′26″W) was chosen by the airport, a tract of land occupied at the time by a ski slope, which the City of Akron agreed to lease to the Soap Box Derby organization for $1 per year. Following its announcement on July 29, 1936, construction began on a 1,600 feet (490 metres) paved track with landscaping, installation of the rented grandstands and bleachers, and the erection of a wooden, two-deck bridge over the finish line, all by WPA workers. Of the 1,600 feet, 1,175 feet (358 metres) of it was the race course, with the top staging area and bottom run-out comprising the remainder. Extensive infrastructural provisions were made for the expected media as well.

Exactly three weeks later, on August 16, 1936, the first All-American at Derby Downs (officially the 3rd All-American) was run. A pre-race parade with 11 bands entertained a throng of nearly 100,000 who were welcomed officially by Governor Martin L. Davey and Mayor Lee D. Schroy. Competing in the race were 116 boys from across America and one from South Africa, making this the first World Championship. Witnessed by a cadre of 500 media personal from around the globe was 3rd All-American Champion Herbert Muench Jr. 14, of St. Louis, Missouri taking home the top prize of a $2,000 four-year college scholarship.

==== Enrollment on the rise ====
Now that Derby had a home it was able to cater to the increasing participation of still more communities organizing additional local races and sending champs of their own. At the Inaugural All-American the number of boys that entered was 34, but by 1936 that number had exploded to 116. In 1939 there were 176 cities that wanted to participate, but due to Derby Downs' limit to just 120 cars at the time, some communities had to double up or hold regional races to send just one boy representing multiple communities instead of two or more. Even by 1935 there were an estimated 50,000 boys across America that were already building cars to participate.

In 1940 the popularity of the sport meant that the All-American would accommodate 130 cars from around the world, increasing to 148 by the end of the decade. In 1959 that number was raised to 170, and by 1969 a total of 257 cars came to Akron. Today the All-American comprises three official divisions across numerous race programs, and in 2023 reached 320 participants.

== Classic Derby ==
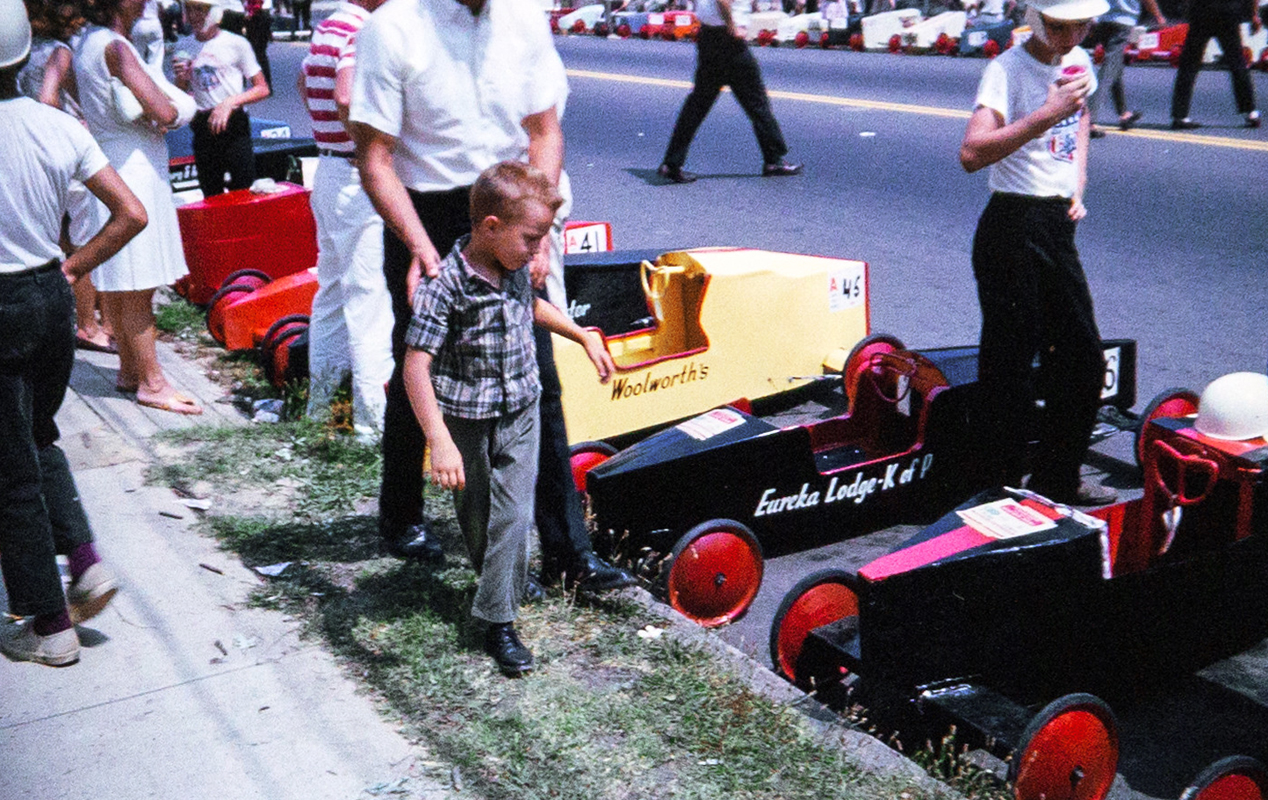
Unidentified racers sitting track-side in Richmond, Virginia in 1965

Following WWII and a return home of its service personnel, America embraced a new optimism and chance for greater prosperity, thanks partly to the G.I. Bill introduced in 1944. In 1946 the Soap Box Derby returned as well, and Chevrolet wasted no time in marketing the Derby with the same amount of pomp and pageantry it lavished upon the boys half a decade earlier. By now the Derby was an obsession for boys who entered, with thoughts of nothing better than to construct a car in the hopes of making it to Akron. Considered to be Soap Box Derby's heyday or "golden age," attendance at the All-American routinely reached 70,000 each year. The fanfare surrounding the event was a "big deal" back in the day "when Chevrolet handled the race," said Derby historian and author Ron Reed, who went to his first All-American in 1949 as a boy. "The crowd was always on their feet when the hometown kid went down the hill," so one "had to stand or they couldn't see anything." The cheering was so loud that the announcer calling out the driver's names over the loudspeakers could not be heard. It was "exciting," said Reed.

With each year, Derby regulations were amended and standardized to ensure the safety of drivers. After the war the use of windscreens on cars were still allowed, but by 1948 they were banned outright. Wheels were also standardized with the introduction of the Official Soap Box Derby Tire and axle set that a boy could purchase at his neighborhood Chevy dealership. Weight and dimension restrictions of the car remained generally the same during this time, but as more subtle rules changes were being introduced by the late sixties, car designs became more creative or ingenious in response.

=== Parade of celebrities ===
Part of the attraction of the All-American was the parade of Hollywood and well-known celebrities that made appearances annually. Names like Abbot and Costello, the cast from TV's Bewitched, Lorne Greene and the cast from Bonanza, Rock Hudson, Richard Nixon, Ronald Reagan, Roy Rogers, Dinah Shore, Jimmy Stewart, and Adam West were promoted by Chevrolet leading up to the race. Jimmy Stewart made the most appearances in Akron, six in all—1947–1950, 1952 and 1957. On the occasion of his first visit he called it "The most magnificent spectacle I've ever seen." Into the 1970s, other celebrities included Peter Fonda, George Takei and Tom Hanks.

==== Oil Can Trophy Race ====
Added to the pre-race pageantry at the 1950 All-American was the Oil Can Trophy Race, an exhibition event that pitted three of the guest celebrities against one another in a downhill heat. Each got to pilot a unique and often outlandishly-designed racer made from an oil drum, (Note: At the 1958 All-American are celebrity Oil Can contestants Guy Madison, Eddie Bracken and Pat Boone piloting their oil drum racers across the finish line, with Boone taking the checkered flag.) for a novelty prize called the Oil Can Trophy. Jack Dempsey, Wilbur Shaw and Jimmy Stewart were contestants in the inaugural race, with Dempsey taking the prize. The race was popular with the crowd and kept in the program. When Stewart returned in 1957 for his sixth All-American appearance, he made his third try for the Oil Can Trophy, this time against George Montgomery and Roy Rogers, with Montgomery taking the prize. Having never won after his final attempt, Stewart joked "Always a bridesmaid." In 1962 it was Lorne Greene that beat fellow cast mates Michael Landon and Dan Blocker in a Bonanza-themed showdown, and in 1980 Christopher George won out over wife Linda Day George and actor Bill Daily. Ostensibly lighthearted in tone, the celebs usually played to the crowd for laughs. The spectacle continued into the 2000s.

=== In the face of adversity ===
A boy's climb from obscurity to national fame after winning the All-American usually made the front page of newspapers from coast to coast, some achieving attention depending on just how interesting the climb was, or how much they had to overcome to get there.

==== The Graphite Kid ====
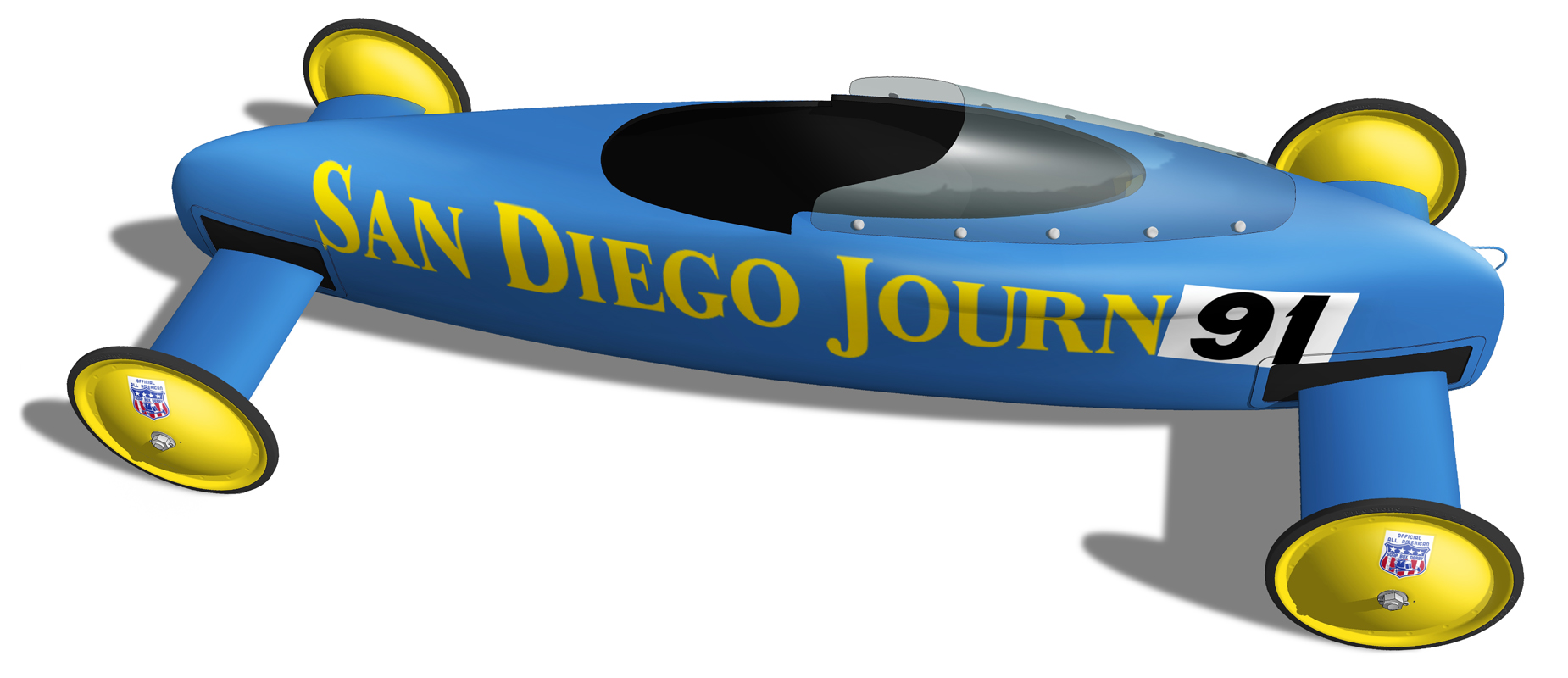
1946 Soap Box Derby World Champion Gil Klecan's car

One such boy is Gilbert Klecan, age 14, the first World Champion following the Second World War, racing a laminate-constructed racer fitted with a streamlined windscreen and equipped with vertical steering of a unique design. A family friend named Chuck Boswell, an aerospace engineer at Convair, told Gil about the San Diego Derby and suggested he build a car that he offered to design. Accepting his offer, Gil entered the 1946 race but in an unpainted car, having just completed it the night before. Winning in San Diego, Gil became eligible to race in Akron, where his car was quickly sent while still being unpainted. When he arrived he hastily painted it before it was lettered, but felt it did little to make it smoother, so Boswell handed him a can of graphite paste, a dry lubricant, to rub all over it in the hopes that it would make the car slicker. While doing so he managed to get some on his clothes and face, giving him the look of a chimney sweep. When Gil emerged the winner at the All-American, the press eagerly snapped photos of the cheerful champ with the blackened face, (Note: Image of 1946 World Champion Gil Klecan beaming on the winners podium with his mother) dubbing him the "Graphite Kid." His photo appeared in Life Magazine.

The next day a film crew wanted to capture Gil racing down the hill, having him trail behind a pickup truck where the camera was mounted. When the director yelled "stop!," meaning "cut!," the driver of the truck heeded, while Gil, unaware, continued headlong into rear bumper, injuring his back and landing him in the hospital for a week. Gil eventually recovered.

Graphite use continued the following year with boys like class B entrant John Englert of Iowa City, Iowa, even dusting his car with talcum powder over the graphite, and fellow racer Craig Penney who followed Gil's example by blackening his face. New regulations in 1948 banned its use anywhere on the car or driver. Even having graphite on one's person was grounds for disqualification. Gil wrote an article that appeared in Mechanix Illustrated in May 1947 which featured construction blueprints of his racer, with details of his steering and suspension designs. His car was exhibited in 2017 at the San Diego Automotive Museum in Balboa Park.

==== Ramblin' Wreck from Georgia ====
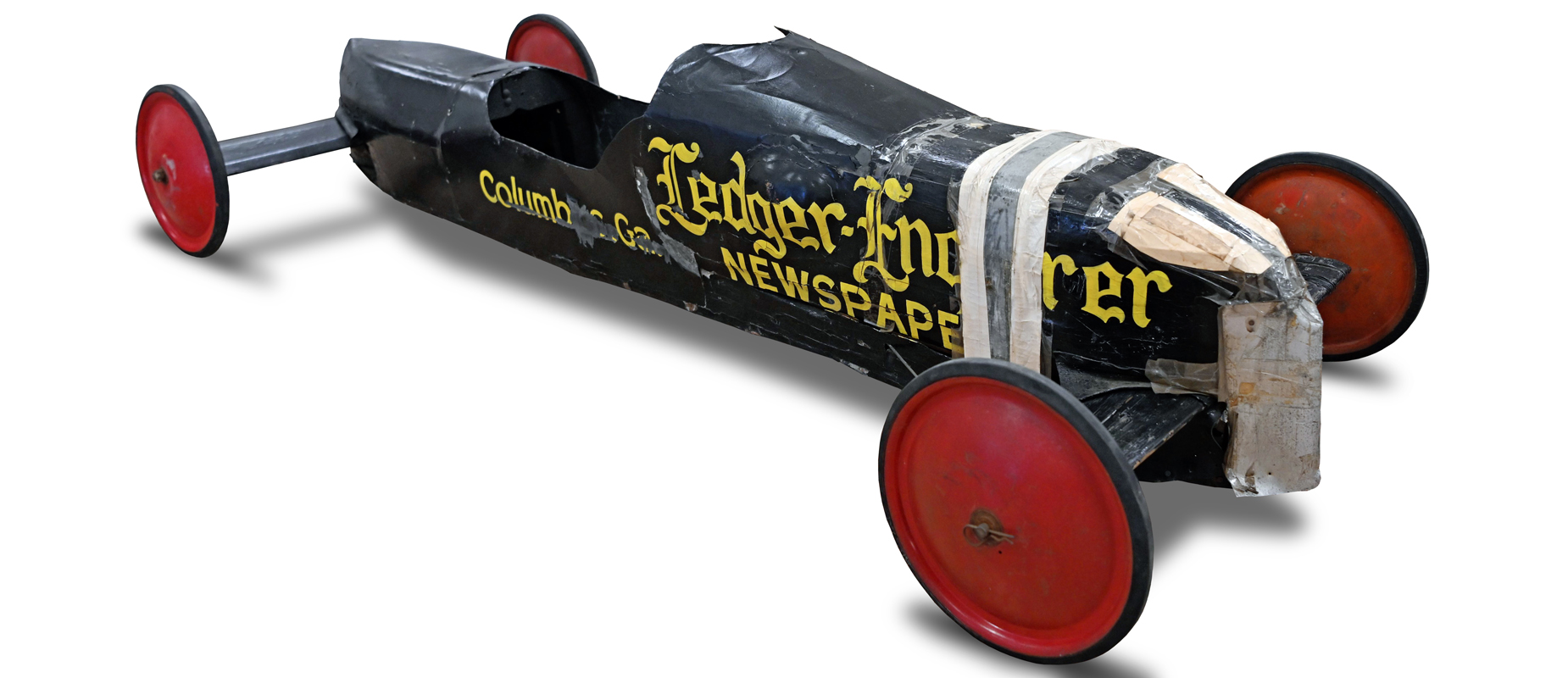
1952 Soap Box Derby World Champion Joe Lunn's car showing crash damage

A heartwarming story is Joe Lunn, who took the World Championship in 1952. Joe was a small and shy farm boy from a poor family that hailed from Thomasville, Georgia. Visiting uncles from Columbus, Georgia, located 150 miles (240 km) northwest of Thomasville, suggested that he enter a goat cart he had built at their local Soap Box Derby race, something Joe knew nothing about. With their help Joe acquired the needed wheels and axles, making changes to the cart to qualify, and signed up as a class B entry at the age of eleven. Arriving on race day, Joe's black racer had no sponsor and certainly looked no match against the more experienced racers that did. It was a surprise to many therefore when he took the championship. A month later he was going to Akron. To accompany him his mother Jewell borrowed the $33.87 from her brothers, Joe's uncles, for a round-trip bus ticket to Akron, having never been north of Columbus before that time.

When Joe arrived in Akron he admitted that he was most impressed by how big the track at Derby Downs was, being 200 feet longer than Columbus', but reasoned that other boys probably felt as scared as he, so he pressed on. In his first heat, his steering cable snapped and he lost control of his car beyond the finish line, striking a guard rail and severely damaging its front end. Joe received a cut across the chest that left a scar and a bump to the head. At this point he was certain that he was out of the race. While being patched up at the first aid station he learned however that he had won, and that his car was being repaired so he could go again, something he was not too keen about.

Race volunteers repaired Joe's car using bailing wire, duct tape, and sheet metal from a flattened lunch box. Three of the damaged wheels replaced with wheels from an older set from 1947, considered by Derby fans regarded as among the fastest used on a Derby car. Joe won the four heats that followed, each by a larger margin than the last. He later recalled that pieces of the car came off during the races. Spectators nicknamed the car "The Ramblin' Wreck from Georgia Tech." In his final heat he set a track record and won the Derby, becoming the first Southerner to do so.

Joe never did go to Georgia Tech, joining the US Navy instead and staying on until 1979. His patched-together car, (Note: Image of 1952 World Champion Joe Lunn posing with his patched-together car) considered the worst-looking winner at the All-American, is on exhibit at the ISBD Hall of Fame Museum in Akron.

==== Doug Hoback ====
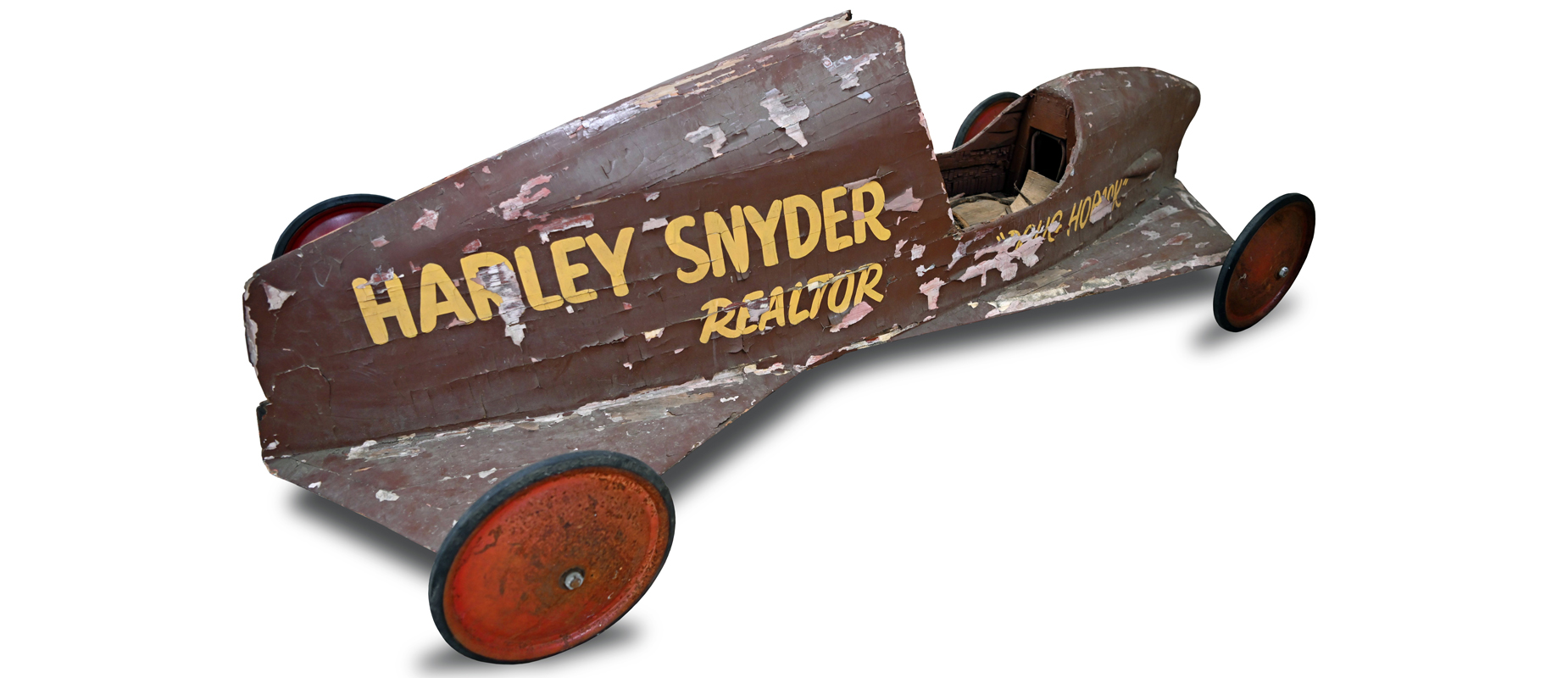
1956 Valparaiso, Indiana racer Doug Hoback's extant car at the 3rd Annual Vintage Derby Car Show in July 2024

A story of courage that made international news was of a boy determined to win one more Soap Box Derby race while battling terminal cancer. Doug Hoback hailed from Valparaiso, Indiana, entering his car as a class B contestant in both the Valparaiso and Gary, Indiana, local races in 1955, winning in Valparaiso and being awarded a brand new bike. In December doctors discovered that Doug had a terminal malignancy, a cancer called lymphosarcoma. His physician, Dr. Leonard Green, stated that all he could do medically was postpone death. Undaunted, Doug expressed his wish that he win next year's Soap Box Derby and earn a trip to Akron. "He never gave up," Green said. On July 4, Doug, now age 13, repeated his win in Valparaiso, this time as a class A entry, and then headed to Gary to compete for the regional title and a chance at Akron. On the day of that race Doug was down 40 pounds from his usual 110-pound weight, and at the time trial run he had to be helped in and out of car due to his weakened condition. When an axle broke halfway down the track, his car veered into the guard rail, ending his chance to compete. Uninjured, he continued to watch the race from the sidelines, seated in his wheelchair. The following day his parents returned from church to find their son's condition had worsened. After being rushed to the hospital in Valparaiso, he died two hours later. "He just gave up," said his father, once he lost his shot at Akron.

Doug's story appeared in newspapers across the US and in Canada (Note: Posted in the Montreal Star, attributed to United Press) telling of his courageous battle. Tom Brown, 13, who raced in Valparaiso the year prior, winning the class A title, and was a pallbearer at Doug's funeral, spoke well of his best friend. When Doug was awarded another bike in this year's race he gave it to Tom, who had his stolen the week prior. To honor Hoback the Gary Soap Box Derby created the Doug Hoback Memorial Award, inaugurated in 1957 with recipient Tommy Osburn and continuing into the seventies, awarded to competitors demonstrating courage and outstanding sportsmanship. His extant brown racer was exhibited at the 3rd Annual Vintage Derby Car Show in July 2024 in Akron, Ohio, courtesy a private collector.

==== Stephen Damon ====
Derby was an attractive activity for all kinds of kids, including Stephen Damon of Norfolk, Virginia, who raced in the Tidewater, Virginia Soap Box Derby local race in 1964 and 1965. His brother Wally, 14, raced also. Unlike most that participated, Stephen was almost completely blind, with 2 percent vision in one eye. Yet as expected with all participants he had to construct his own racer, understandably with the help of his father, Wallis Damon Sr., who would show him where to drill or cut. According to Derby rules he was also expected to drive his own car, although he could name a substitute driver to go in his place. Choosing to drive the car himself he worked out a modern solution by following instructions sent by radio to a receiver in his helmet. The words "radio dispatched" were painted on his class B racer. He was sponsored by the Naval Aviation Safety Center, who loaned the radio equipment. Not quite getting the hang of its use he crashed into a fence at the bottom during his first try. The following year when Stephen was 13-years-old, Navy Commander Richard E. McMahon (1924–2013), an administrator at the Norfolk Naval Air Station, stood watch as Stephen's eyes, talking him calmly down the hill, with Stephen successfully winning his first heat. He was bested in the next heat by Gary Osman, who became overall champ that day. Stephen was enrolled at the Virginia School for the Deaf and the Blind.

=== Derby social life ===
==== Derby camp ====
An added inducement for kids competing in the All-American was attending Derby Camp during the week leading up to the race on the Sunday. Here kids got a chance to meet one another and make new friends, blow off some steam and relax while being engaged in games and camp activities. Located 13 miles (21 km) south of Akron, the YMCA facility, called Camp Y-Noah, housed the kids 8–10 per cabin, each with a trained counselor, set in groups of five or six in the hills overlooking Lake Y-Noah. Activities included horseback riding and hiking on the nature trails, swimming on the beach and dock, and baseball, basketball, tennis and volleyball at the sports facility. The recreation center offered table tennis, a hobby shop and a place to gather and socialize.

==== The Derby family ====
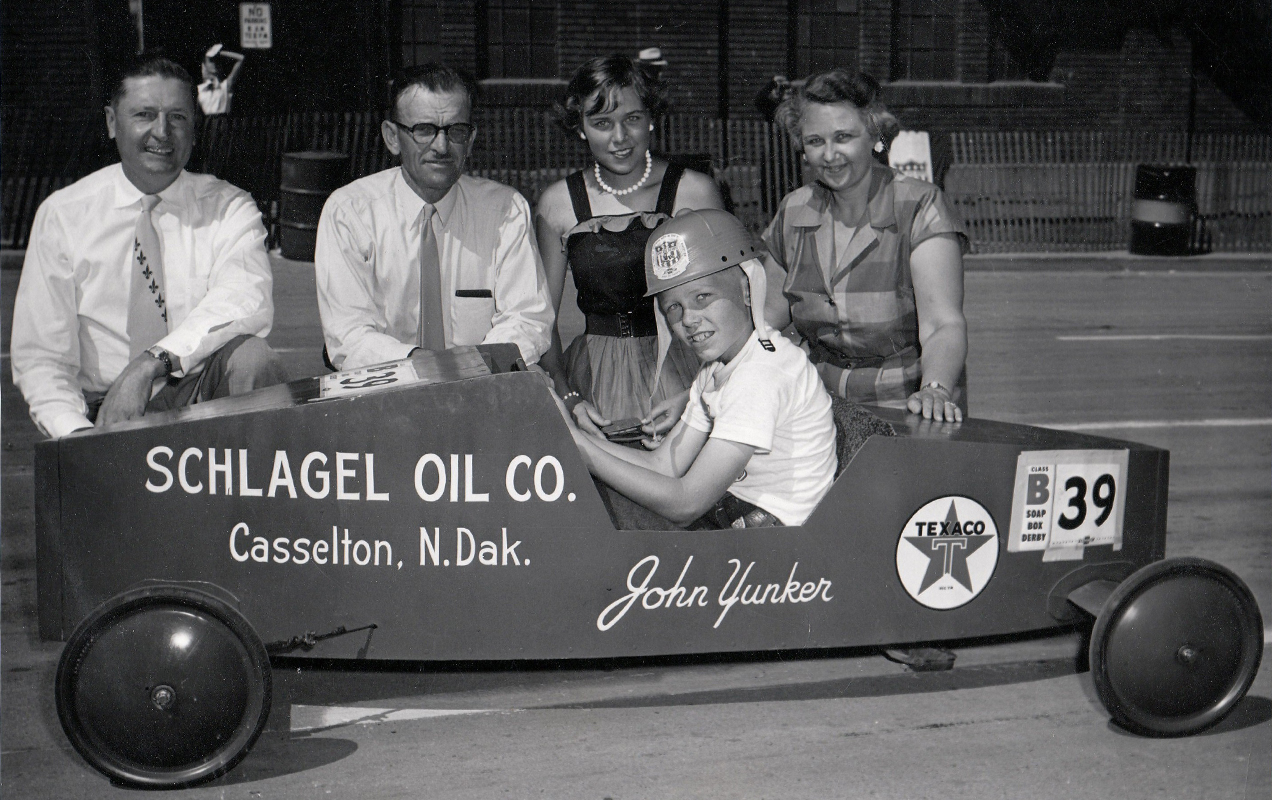
1953 Casselton, North Dakota, class B racer John Yunker with family

This period witnessed the growth of the Derby family (pictured), with fathers who were once racers themselves now putting their own sons into cars to compete. Often with mom's help or support, even sister, an uncle or cousin throwing in, Derby became a family enterprise where two or more brothers would possibly compete against one another in their local race, or a boy would build a car for each year he competed, (Note: Madison, Wisconsin Champion Van Steiner, who began racing at age 11, constructed a car for each year he raced until he won in 1957, his last year of eligibility before turning 16.) passing it down to a younger sibling as he outgrew it. Soap Box Derby's "boy built" rule was understood—albeit frivolously—to mean that dad could help to some degree with his son's construction of the car, which was most often the case, but the outcome meant that father and son worked together, forging a healthy and long lasting relationship that became the backbone of the Soap Box Derby. As with any sport involving family participation, there were parents wanting to win at all cost, particularly since the stakes were so high, with a kid acting simply as jockey, piloting a car that was built by an adult or hired professional. This became a growing concern and constant complaint heard around various races, (Note: The biggest complaint among Derby families was with competitors showing up at the track with cars that looked too good to be 'kid-built.') with officials eventually taking measures to guard against such occurrences.

==== Winning Derby families ====
Working in a Derby family had advantages, as each member benefited from the other to improve their chances at winning races. Below are examples of members from the same family winning multiple All-American World Championships.

- The Townsend family from Anderson, Indiana, was the first to have multiple members win the All-American World Championship; Terry in 1957 and brother Barney in 1959.
- The Yarborough family from Elk Grove, California, was the first to have siblings win consecutive All-American World Championships; Curt in 1973 and brother Bret in 1974.
- The Ferdinand family from Canton, Ohio, was the first to have a sister and brother win the All-American World Championship, and the first to win across two divisions; Joan (Senior Division) in 1976 and Mark (Junior Division) in 1977.
- The Thornton family was the first to have cousins win the All-American World Championship; Bonnie (Masters Division) in 1992 and Sally (Super Stock Division) in 2006
- The Endres family took two All-American World Championships; Joel (Kit Car Division) in 1994 and Alan (Masters Division) in 1999.
- The Clemens family from Blue Springs, Missouri, was the first to win multiple All-American World Championships in the Rally program; Jamee (Rally Kit Car Division) in 1994 and Amy (Rally Masters Division) in 2002.
- The VanFossen family took two All-American World Championships in the Rally program; Ashley in 2001 and Dennis in 2007, both in the Rally Super Stock Division.

==== Ken Cline ====
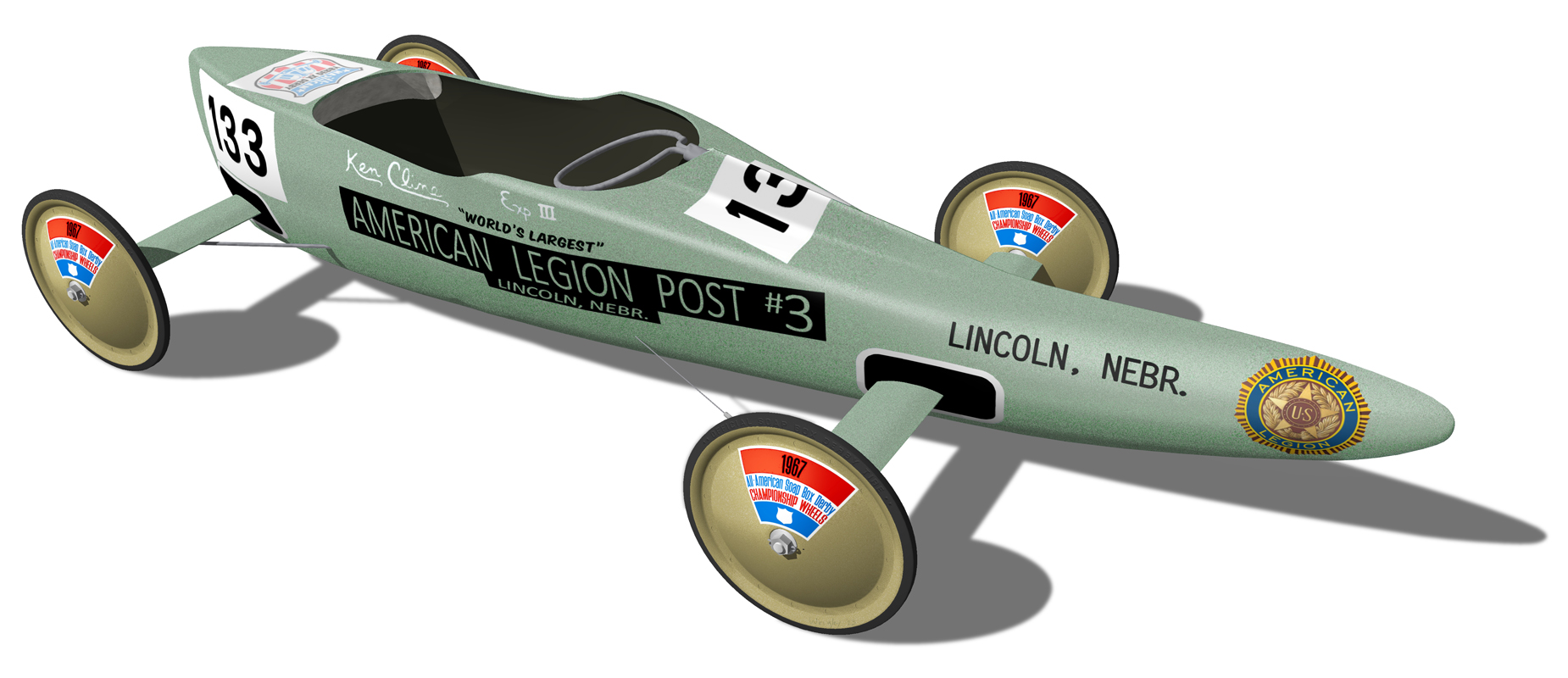
1967 Soap Box Derby World Champion Ken Cline's racer, dubbed "the Grasshopper"

A Derby family success story is that of Ken Cline, 1967 World Champion and AASBD Hall of Fame inductee in 2017. Ken came from a large family of nine kids, each having raced in the Soap Box Derby. Their father was regional manager for Northern Natural Gas and relocated often. While the family was living in Midland, Texas, brothers Richard and Michael won that local's races in 1964 and 1965, respectively, with both going to Akron. Ken raced in Midland in 1966 and was favored to win, but a rain-soaked track hampered his car. The following year he won in Lincoln, Nebraska, when they lived there and went on the take the All-American crown a month later. Sister Rita went to Akron in 1972 having won in Amarillo, Texas.

Ken's win in Akron happened during Derby's peak, in a car of unprecedented design. Called "the Grasshopper," a name he disliked at first since his name for it was "Experimental III," it was a low profile, needle-nosed racer with a short wheelbase, the minimum allowed. It was also the first World Championship car having the front axle placed rearward, a trend that continued well into the seventies. From among the numerous awards in the technical achievement categories he received the Best Designed trophy at the All-American on top of his competitive win.

Continuing the family tradition, Ken's daughter Alethia won the local championship as a Senior Division entry in Chicago, Illinois, in 1987, becoming the first child of a World Champion to race in Akron and advancing to the second round after beating the Akron Champ in the first. His son Houston raced also in the Junior Division. Cline became director of the Lincoln, Nebraska local race, and helped organize the Greater Chicago Soap Box Derby when he moved there in 1986. After becoming its director he served as regional director for Midwest states in 1990. Cline was part of the team that developed and designed the pre-fabricated, fiber glass shell Stock Division car introduced in 1992. It is still being used today. He is founder and director of the Annual Vintage Derby Car Show taking place each July in Akron, Ohio during Race Week. His extant car is on exhibit at the ISBD Hall of Fame Museum at Derby Downs.

== 1970s ==
In the late sixties enrollment at the Soap Box Derby was at an all-time-high, with craftsmanship and car design exploring innovative new concepts that favored drivers in a full lay-down position instead of the standard sit-up configuration. At the onset of the 1970s Derby Downs was confronted with social pressure brought on by the Women's Liberation Movement demanding that institutions like the Soap Box Derby embrace more modern trends. In 1971 it was announced therefore that girls would be allowed to race for the first time.

=== Girls join Derby ===
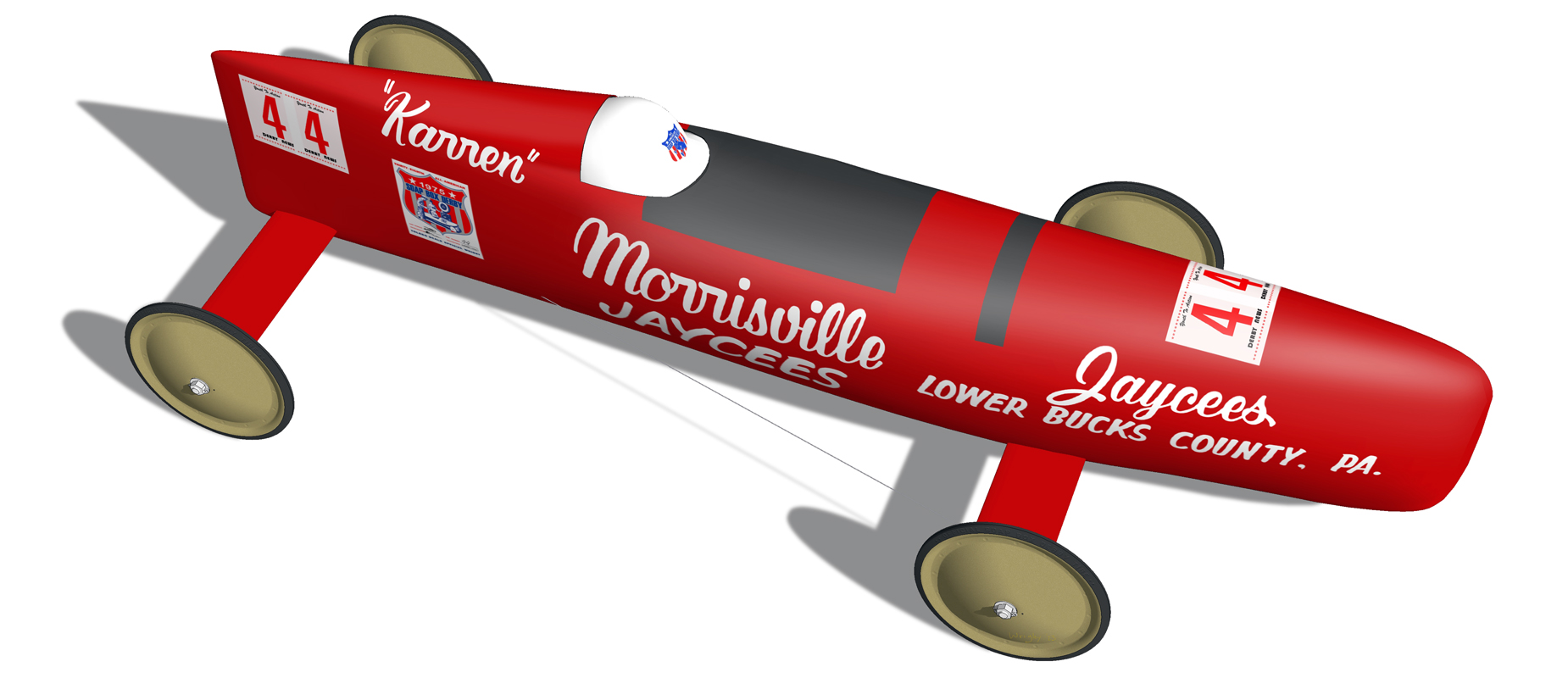
1975 All-American Soap Box Derby World Champion Karren Stead's lay-down car, at the ISBD Hall of Fame Museum at Derby Downs in Akron, Ohio

In 1933 Alice Johnson (1921–1985) was one of two girls to race at the very first city-wide soap box race in Dayton, having constructed her car with the help of her father, Dayton aviator Edward "Al" Johnson. Taking second, she was awarded a bouquet of flowers from winner Randall Custer, and a boy's bike. The following year she raced again in the Dayton local race, taking third.

No Derby Rule Book ever stated that girls were unable to compete officially, but it was suggested in the language of promotional material and newspaper advertisements, with Chevrolet dealerships even refusing to accept girl applicants or sell them wheels and axles. There was also resistance from many, including its founder Myron Scott, who stated that he devised the sport to be exclusively 'boys only' from the start. Counter to this, popular opinion was positing a more liberal stance, with Chevrolet receiving legal pressure from local Derby organizations wishing to enter girls. This coupled with the fact that former racers that were now dads wanted to participate in Derby once more by putting their child into a car, but only had daughters. Mason Bell, general manager of the Soap Box Derby from 1964 to 1972, knew that it was only a matter of time before girls be let in.

Unlike most organized sports, the Soap Box Derby chose not to split competition along gender lines by creating a separate category for each, meaning all contestants would compete on an equal footing. At the 34th All-American, Rebecca Carol Phillips (1959–2023) of Temple, Texas, was the very first girl to take a run down the track at Derby Downs, racing the first heat in lane 1, and winning it. The following year two girls cracked the top ten in a field of 236 entries: Priscilla Freeman of Chapel Hill, North Carolina, who took 5th, and Karen Johnson of Suburban Detroit, Michigan, who came 7th. In no time the girls equaled the boys, and in 1975 the first female World Champion honor fell to Karren Stead, 11, (her car pictured) of Lower Bucks County, Pennsylvania, who not only won but did so in an arm cast (Note: Image of 1976 World Champion Karren Stead in her arm cast, standing with her car) she acquired a few days earlier after an injury at Derby Camp.

=== Chevrolet bows out ===
By the sixties there were concerns among Derby officials about Chevrolet's continued sponsorship of the Soap Box Derby, filling Derby Downs with a sense of uncertainty leading up to the seventies. Till now Chevrolet was the Derby's sole national sponsor, but questions within the General Motors management was whether it was still benefiting from its investment. Derby general manager Mason Bell was aware of these concerns and worked tirelessly to keep Chevrolet on board as long as possible. GM general manager John DeLorean stated on record that he felt the Derby was outdated and too expensive to hold, so the hard decision fell to him, and on September 28, 1972, it was announced that Chevrolet would end its sponsorship. The Akron Chamber of Commerce stepped up to ensure that the World Championship race the following year would take place, but the budget could not come close to match Chevrolet's nearly $1 million annual budget, though Chevrolet did pledge a final $30,000 for the 1973 race. They also transferred all rights and chattels over to the new sponsor for a single settlement of $1, including the Soap Box Derby name and logo, and capital used in staging the All-American like structures, finish-line bridge, bleachers and equipment. The All-American was held successfully in 1973, but enrollment had dropped by almost half.

=== Cheating scandal ===
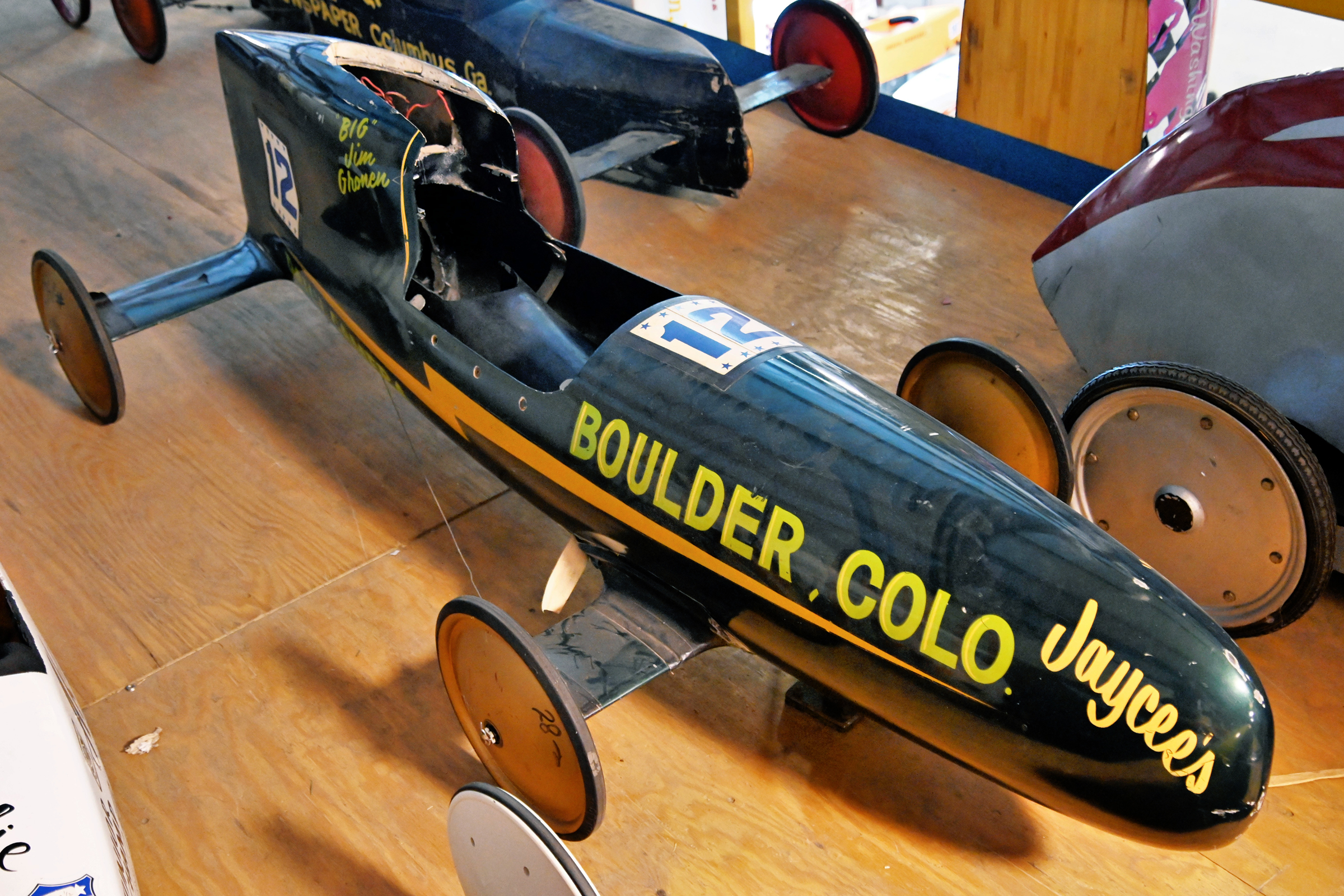
Gronen's disqualified car

Electromagnet electrical wiring discovered hidden within headrest

Following Chevrolet's stepping down as national sponsor, Derby Downs was beset by a cheating scandal that threatened to damage its credibility as a trusted American institution. In 1973, World Champion Jimmy Gronen, 14, of Boulder, Colorado, was stripped of his title just two days after being crowned the winner after he was caught cheating. Unusual discrepancies surrounding Gronen's margins of victory and heat times tipped off Derby officials, and an investigation of his car (pictured left) was conducted using X-ray examination, which revealed an electromagnet in the nose of the car, along with electrical wires connected it to a battery. By Gronen leaning his helmet against a switch hidden in the helmet fairing (pictured right) of the car's body, the electromagnet became charged, effectively making the nose of the car grab the steel plate of the starting gate. When the gate swung forward, freeing the cars so they could start their run, Gronen's car was pulled forward as well, giving it a boost. Videotape of the race showed a suspiciously sudden lead for Gronen just a few feet after each heat began. Other suspicions were Gronen's heat times progressively slowing down as the race wore on—heat times usually get faster each time a racer completes a heat—as the battery drained power each time the circuit was closed, reducing the effectiveness of the magnet. The margin of victory for a race heat is normally no more than 1 to 3 feet (0.30 to 0.91 m). Gronen's early heat victories were in the 20 to 30 feet (6.1 to 9.1 m) range.

Midway through the race, Derby officials also replaced Gronen's wheels after chemicals were found to be applied to the wheels' rubber. The chemicals caused the tire rubber to swell, which reduced the rolling resistance of the tire. In the final heat, Gronen finished narrowly ahead of Brent Yarborough, who was declared the 1973 champion two days later.

Gronen's uncle and legal guardian at the time, wealthy engineer Robert Lange, was indicted for contributing to the delinquency of a minor and paid a $2,000 settlement.

=== Derby rebuilds ===
By the end of the year the Akron Chamber of Commerce severed ties with the Derby Downs, which now needed a new sponsor. The next month the Akron Jaycees Junior Chamber of Commerce instituted the "Save the All-American Committee", which became the All-American Soap Box Derby, Inc. led by Ron D. Baker, general manager at Derby Downs from 1974 till 1977. In preparation for the 1974 season, new rules were instituted to govern against the possibility of a repeat of previous year's cheating scandal. The gates at the starting line were rendered magnet-proof.

==== Back to basics Derby (BBD) ====
Part of Derby Downs' campaign in 1974 to address the cheating scandal was to consider introducing a back-to-basics-Derby program, or BBD, which favored simplification over "runaway sophistication." Written and submitted to Derby officials by art-director and film-maker Robert Cihi and introduced in February of that year, the program was basically a pared-down version of the Official Rules Book, from twenty pages to four. An avid Derby fan and participant, with two boys having already participated in local races and one making to the All-American in 1971, Cihi criticized the rules for being much too complicated for the average competitor to understand. "It's pretty sick, deluding and insane to think an 11-year-old boy or girl could take home the official rule book and read it. No child can work as long as it takes to build a car according to the official rule book," said Cihi. He felt it catered to those privileged professional families that could invest the time and money to build a car of such sophistication. Ronald D. Baker stated "Without a doubt, it's the trend of the future, the Derby's way of moving back to basics" when speaking about Akron's decision to introduce the Junior kits two years later.

Because of the scandal, the clandestine practice of cars being made in professional factories rather than by the kids themselves was beginning to be challenged openly. The emphasis shifted to simpler, kid-built wood construction, the cars themselves being assembled in a manner that allowed judges to uncover any device like the one found in the magnet car. Pre-race inspectors also began to randomly question a larger number of kids of their knowledge of their car's construction to verify whether they did in fact do the work. This led to three contestants being disqualified in 1974, receiving protest from the kids' parents yet praise from others wanting to protect the integrity of the Derby. Local organizers sending a champion to the Akron also had to sign an affidavit attesting to the legal compliance of the car being shipped.

The 1974 All-American race came off as a success, though again the attendance had dropped. Curt Yarborough, (Note: Image of 1974 World Champion Curt Yarborough's car) 11, of Elk Grove, California, was crowned World Champion in a field of 99 entries, and claiming the first back-to-back win of siblings at the All-American, following his younger brother Brent Yarborough, (Note: Image of 1973 World Champion Brent Yarborough's car) who won the year prior.

=== Novar sponsorship ===
As the 1975 season was winding down, the Soap Box Derby still had no sponsor. In late November, Barberton, Ohio, firm Novar Electronics pledged $165,000 for the All-American the following year, almost double what was spent on the previous two years combined. Novar president James H. Ott felt that losing a popular institution like the Soap Box Derby in Akron would be a tragedy, especially during America's bi-centennial, admitting that most of the management personal, including himself, were born in Akron. The agreement with Derby Downs was to continue with the annual contribution, stipulating that it would give a three-year lead time if Novar intended to end its sponsorship, avoiding the shock of Chevrolet's stepping down a few years prior. Novar's annual contributions continued until 1988 when a fiscal downturn forced them to withdraw.

=== Junior Division ===
Following the girl's entry into the sport that culminated in Karren Stead's World Championship win in 1975, Derby Downs introduced the Junior Division the following year. Open to kids ages ten through twelve, it became an entry-level tier with an entirely new, "patterned" car design sold as a kit, with easy-to-follow instructions, and included everything except the wood and tools to build a complete racer. Kids ages twelve (Note: Twelve-year-olds had the option or racing as a Junior or Senior Division entry.) through fifteen, now identified as the Senior Division, would continue to construct cars from scratch. This now meant that the All-American would crown two champions, a Junior and Senior, making Karren Stead the last sole Champion at the All-American.

Champions for 1976 were Joan Ferdinand (Note: Image of 1976 Senior World Champion Joan Ferdinand (holding plaque) with her family and car) of Canton, Ohio, in the Senior Division and Phil Raber (Note: Image of 1976 Junior World Champion Phil Raber with his car) of New Philadelphia, Ohio, in the Junior. 1976 also had the distinction of allowing the return of windscreens, permitted on Junior cars only—Raber's champ car had one—but this was discontinued the following year and has remained so ever since. The Junior Division races at the 40th All-American were sponsored by Keds Shoes.

== Expansion ==
The years leading into the 21st century were occupied by administrative efforts of the Soap Box Derby to maintain fiscal solvency, with Derby Downs continuing to secure a national sponsor. The most visible change at Derby Downs was further expansion of the divisions into three: Stock, Super Stock and Masters; along with the introduction of the fiber glass and plastic shell kits that are still being used today. Rally-format racing also became part of the All-American curriculum in 1993.

=== Jeff Iula ===
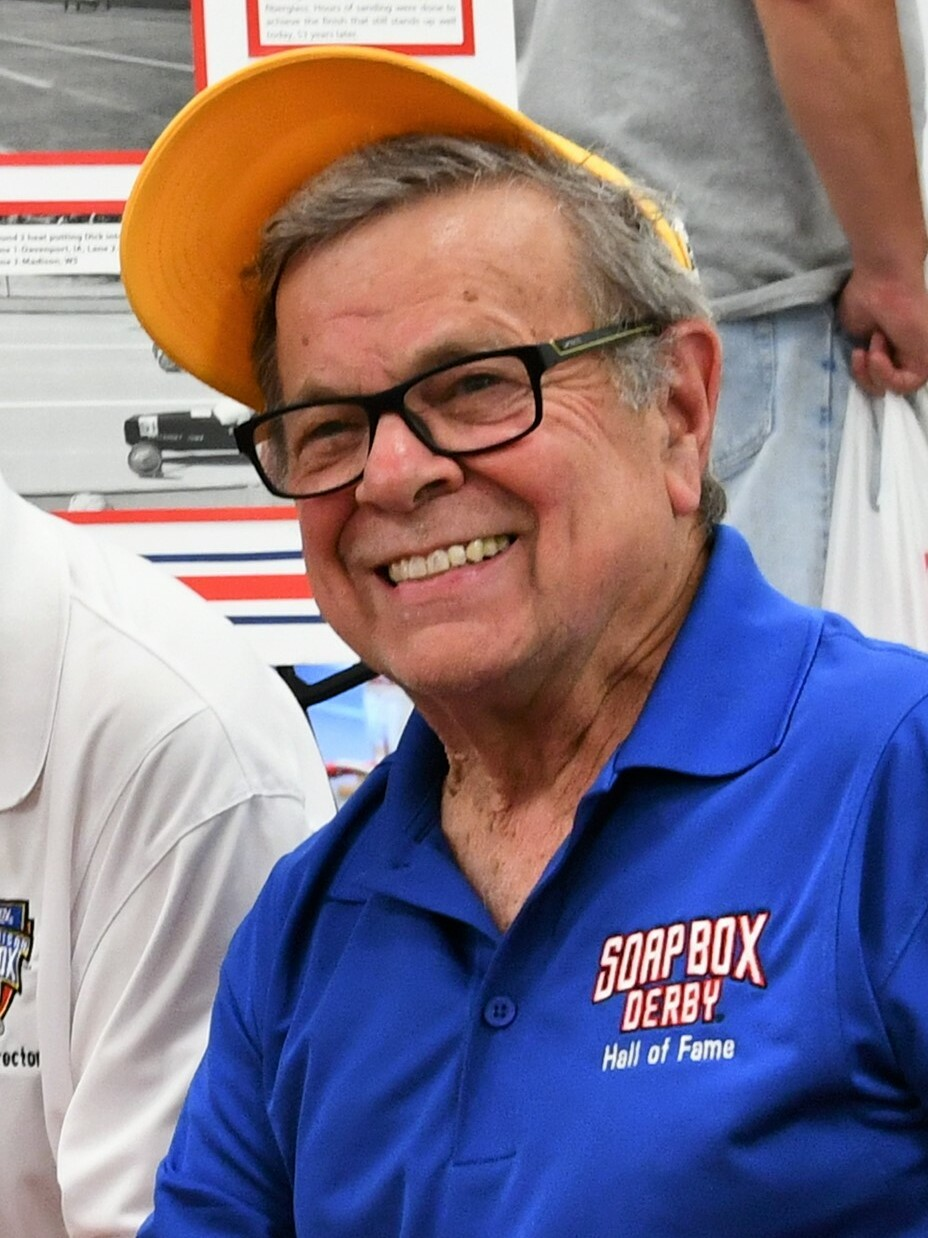
Jeff Iula at the Inaugural Vintage Derby Car Show in Akron, OH in 2022

In 1988 assistant general manager Jeff Iula became GM, helming Derby Downs through its most fiscally challenging years before stepping down in 2009, the longest serving GM in Derby history. A self-described Derby encyclopedia, Jeff is widely regarded as the one individual that can cite Soap Box Derby history from memory. In Akron and within the Derby community he is called "Mr. Derby," his car's vanity plates being so inscribed.

During his tenure Iula oversaw sweeping changes to the Derby, beginning with sponsorship from a variety of benefactors. In 1988 Novar's twelve-year financial campaign supporting the Derby ended, but First National Bank of Ohio quickly stepped up with support of $175,000 per year for two years, plus $25,000 for promotions. This was followed by candy maker Leaf, Inc. from 1993 to 1994. In 1998 Goodyear made contributions as a national sponsor, with NASCAR signing on in 2002 in a multi-year agreement through their Youth Program Initiative, and Home Depot in 2003. In 2005 Levi Strauss Signature began pledging the $5,000 scholarship for each All-American division winner through 2007. Iula also oversaw creation of the three official divisions and full implementation of the prefabricated kits, beginning with the introduction of the Stock in 1992, the Super Stock in 1994 and the Masters in 1999.

Born in Indianapolis, Indiana, Jeff was first introduced to Derby at age nine when his father Ralph Iula, working in promotions for the Akron Beacon Journal, took him to a race. "He was crazy about it," said Iula." He would remember everything about everything and he grew up loving it." Because he felt that there would be a conflict of interest, the senior Iula would not allow his son to race. Even though he never built a car nor ran in a local event, he was permitted to substitute for the 1966 Okinawa Champion Raymond J. Rapoza, who was unable to attend due to an airline strike, though his car did arrive in Akron, which Jeff got to drive. Having not won his one and only heat, "it did not dampen his enthusiasm," said his father. By the early-seventies he began volunteering in a variety of roles, like working tirelessly on maintenance of the grandstands to recruiting volunteers to help out. In 1976 he was hired on as administrative assistant after being an employee at the Beacon Journal. In the announcement he was already being referred to as "Derby historian."

As Derby spokesperson and expert commentator, Iula has been interviewed on A&E, CBS, ESPN, Fox News, HBO, PBS, The Today Show and Wide World of Sports. He has also been quoted in the Akron Beacon Journal, The Boston Globe, Car & Driver, the Chicago Tribune, New York Daily News and The New York Times, Sports Illustrated and USA Today. In 2006 Iula was inducted into the Soap Box Derby Hall of Fame. With co-author Bill Ignizio he penned How I Saw It: My Photographic Memory of the Soap Box Derby in 2011. Following his stepping down as general manager he became councilman-at-large for the City of Cuyahoga Falls, Ohio, where he currently resides. In 2026 he reenacted his 1966 drive.

=== Stock and Kit Car Divisions ===
To expand enrollment further, Derby introduced a third category in 1992, called the Stock Division, which now became the entry-level tier with the introduction of the new pre-fabricated, fiber glass kit car. Kids continuing to hand-build the wooden kits raced in a new mid-level tier, called the Kit Car Division. This meant that there would be three champions at the All-American instead of two, each representing their division. The Masters racer remained the only non-kit car that racers had to fabricate from scratch until 1999, when a prefabricated Masters kit, called the "Scottie" was made available for sale.

Since 1976, the top-tier Senior/Master Division cars were fully-reclined lay-down designs, while the Junior/Stock and Kit Car Division entries remained sit-ups. From 1992 to 1998 many Masters cars returned to the sit-up configuration, with James Marsh winning the 1998 Masters Division World Championship in a sit-up design. In 1999 a fully prefabricated kit for the Masters Division, dubbed the "Scottie" after Derby creator Myron Scott, debuted, ending the sit-up era for top-tier racers.

=== Rally racing ===
==== National Derby Rallies ====
Rally racing began in the mid-seventies when doubts about Derby Downs' redrafting of its rules for 1974, meant to discourage cheating, drew criticism for being too complex for kids to grasp. This resulted in organizations outside its jurisdiction planning competitions of their own. Operating independently from the Soap Box Derby, National Derby Rallies—or NDR, was established in 1977, conducting races nationwide across ten districts, with five being held in each over the course of the year. This appealed to families who wanted to see their kids get more than a single use out of a racer that took time and money to build. Created as a "grand-prix style" program, kids got to travel to other communities outside their own, providing greater opportunity to develop their racing skills in preparation for their local Soap Box Derby. The program was based on a points accrual system, with the top six contestants in each district going to the National Derby Rally Championship race. Befitting the rally format, the location of the Nationals was hosted by a different host city each year. In 1978 it was held in Warren, Ohio, in 1979 and 1980 Chattanooga, Tennessee, and in 1981 Allentown, Pennsylvania.

NDR continues to conduct its own program, running concurrently with the Soap Box Derby race season, with contestants and their families participating actively in both. Operating across five divisions, they are Stock, Super Stock and Masters, which employ the official Derby kits, and NDR Masters and Legacy, which allow non-kit, hand-built construction with no age cap for the driver. NDR is based in Hermitage, Pennsylvania. The Nationals will be hosted in 2024 and 2025 by South Charleston Soap Box Derby and the City of South Charleston, West Virginia.

==== Soap Box Derby Rally Race Program ====
In 1986 Derby Downs officially adopted a Rally format of its own by introducing its Rally Division, followed in 1993 by the first All-American Rally World Championship. With the Rally Division added to the All-American, Akron now crowned six Champions each year. Today it functions across 12 regions, plus one for international competitors, accepting entries in all three official Derby divisions. Like the NDR the program is based on a points accrual system.

=== FirstEnergy sponsorship ===
In 2012 FirstEnergy signed on as title sponsor, with its name being added to the All-American, now officially the FirstEnergy All-American Soap Box Derby. Without a large sponsor since 2007 and in the red the year prior, Derby president and CEO Joe Mazur estimated that Derby Downs will be in the black this year, but just barely. Though he could not disclose the amount of the contribution at the time, he did state that FirstEnergy had made a three-year commitment. On July 19, 2024, FirstEnergy announced officially that it would extend its title sponsorship three more years through to 2027.

==== Strategic plan ====
During those first three years, Mazur set about writing and implementing a strategic plan, shifting Derby's mandate from youth orientation to education programs and greater adult participation, including having them race. The plan also opened up use of the track facility in more creative ways involving community outreach, with events like autism day, senior citizens day, and grandparents day as well as renting the track out to community interest groups and various corporate benefits. With the plan being put into effect along with continued sponsorship from FirstEnergy, Derby Downs was able to make good on its debts, ending 2014 with a healthy surplus.

In 2019 FirstEnergy reaffirmed its commitment to sponsoring the Derby for another five years. They also provided six billboards in the area to promote the All-American, and were also a source of numerous volunteers, said Derby president Mark Gerberich during the announcement. The sponsorship amounted to over $1 million through 2023 and the 85th running of the All-American. In February 2023 it was announced that Akron-based Myers Industries, a manufacturer of the Super Stock kits and shells, became a major sponsor and entered a partnership with the ISBD that allows Derby Downs to discount the price of Super Stock car kits and Super Stock car shells for the next 3-years.

== General managers ==
- C.P. Fisken (1934–1946) 12 years
- Myron E. Scott (1946–1954) 8 years
- W.J. "Jake" King (1954–1957) 3 years
- Bruce Overby (1957–1961) 4 years
- David G. Rummell (1962–1964) 2 years
- Mason Bell (1964–1972) 8 years
- Paul Livik (1973–1973) 1 year
- Ronald D. Baker (1974–1977) 3 years
- Wayne L. Alley (1978–1988) 10 years
- Jeff Iula (1988–2009) 21 years (Note: Holding the post for 21 years, Jeff Iula is the longest serving general manager at the Soap Box Derby)

== International Soap Box Derby ==
In 1936 the Soap Box Derby became an international affair when cars from outside the US participated at the All-American National race in Akron, with a competitor from South Africa in 1936 and another from Canada in 1937. Three cars from abroad entered in 1938: Canada, Hawaii (not yet a US State) and Panama, although Hawaii was permitted to participate as an American entry. Other participants since then have included Australia, Germany, Guam, Ireland, Japan, Mexico, New Zealand, Panama, the Philippines, Puerto Rico and Venezuela. Switzerland has also conducted their own races since 1970 in Ticino and German-speaking Switzerland. No champion representing that country has raced at the All-American.

=== Canada ===
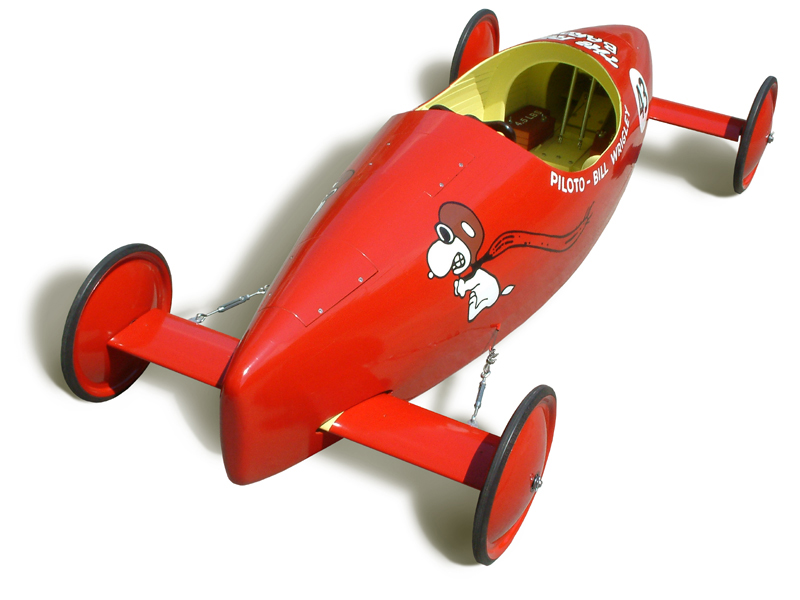
A replica of a Canadian soap box racer from 1969

Canada was one of the earliest entries into organizing its own local races outside the US, chief among them the Kinsmen Coaster Classic, which debuted in Montreal, Quebec, in 1938. Two of Canada's most prominent entries were Mission City (now Mission, British Columbia), and St. Catharines, Ontario, both of whom were affiliated with the Soap Box Derby as official franchises and were qualified to send champs to the All-American in Akron. Mission acquired the rights to the Western Canada Soapbox Derby Championships in 1946 and the Mission Regional Chamber of Commerce, previously named the Mission City & District Board of Trade, organized the event annually until 1973. It resumed again in 1999. St. Catharines ran races from 1947 until 1972. In Eastern Canada, communities that held races included Aylmer, Quebec, Beauharnois, Quebec, Laval, Quebec, Nepean, Ontario, Peterborough, Ontario, Sainte-Genevieve, Quebec, Stratford, Ontario, Trois-Rivières, Quebec, and Gatineau, Quebec, which played host to the Canadian National Soap Box Derby Championship each year. None of these qualified to send their champs to compete in Akron.

From among Canada's many attempts at capturing an All-American World Championship in Akron, St. Catharines fared the best at Derby Downs, with Terri Martinson taking second place at the 59th All-American in 1996. Andy Vasko of St. Catharines took third place at the 20th All-American in 1957. In the non-competitive category honoring technical achievements, St. Catharines' Ken Thomas took home the Best Construction Award at the 30th All-American in 1967.

Today Canada remains active in various communities across the nation, with five participating at International Soap Box Derby-sanctioned races. These include Drummond, New Brunswick, Lincoln, Ontario, Saint John, New Brunswick, Smiths Falls, Ontario, and Tyne Valley, Prince Edward Island. The Swift Current Soapbox Racing Association in Swift Current, Saskatchewan has hosted races since 1983, making it the longest continuous Soap Box Derby race in Canada. Each year around fifty junior and senior cars are loaned out to kids that sign up. 2024 will mark its 41st race.

=== Germany ===
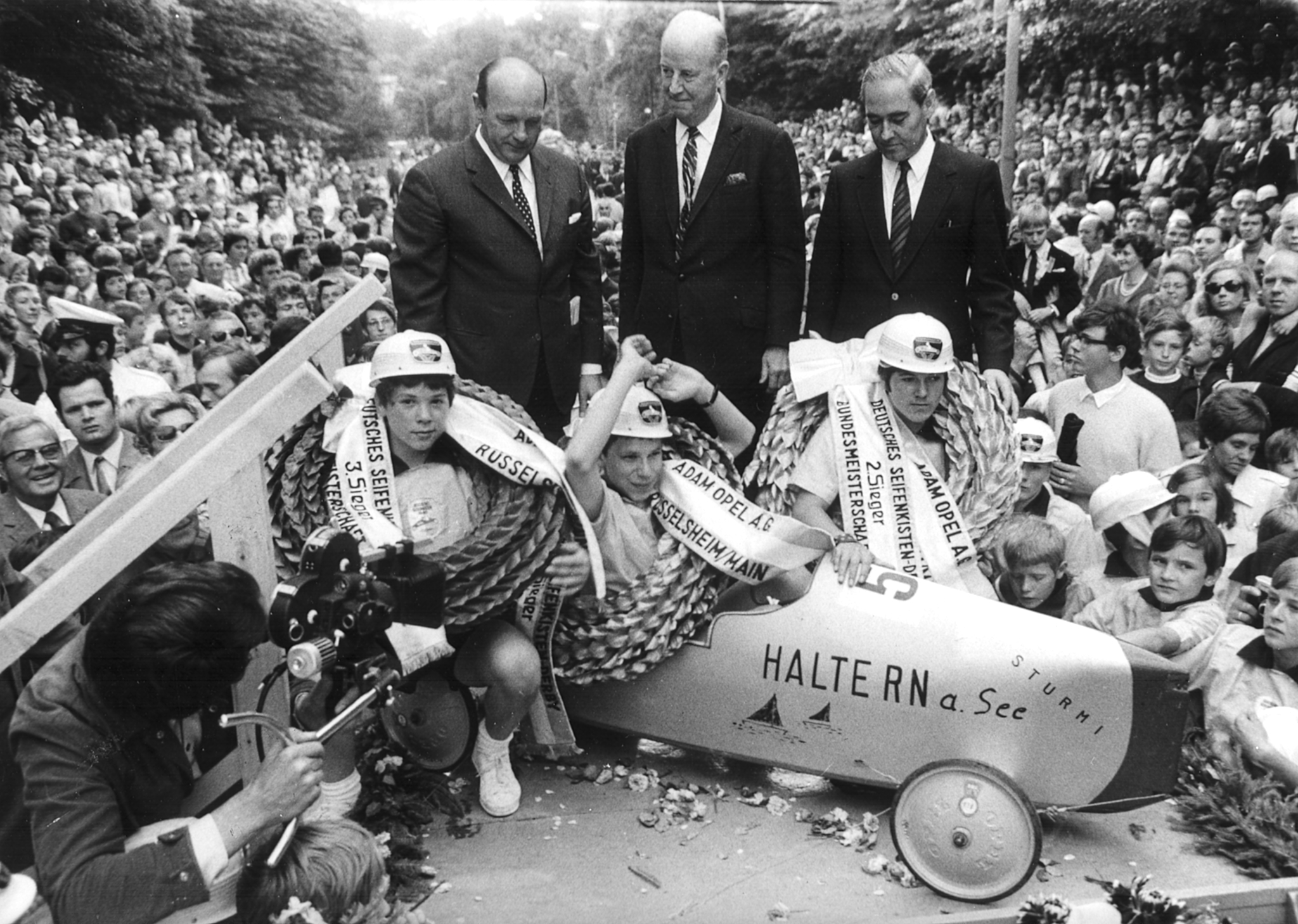
1970 German Championship with (l-r) 3rd place Rudolf Breinl, German Champion Heinz Gerding and runner-up Karl-Heinz Hartrampf

Germany, the most active member of the international Derby community, began races in 1949 in what was then the US-occupation zone of Germany and Berlin. Called the Deutschen Seifenkisten Derby or DSKD, its national sponsor was Adam Opel Automobile Works, which took over from US Armed Forces in 1951, and supplied the official wheels used on the cars. Over the next ten years this led to 214 communities sending local champs to the German Nationals, its overall champion representing Germany at the All-American in Akron.

==== German Derby classes ====
DSKD remains active today, conducted across four classes. The first three follow strict rules; the last is more relaxed.

- Junior (ages 7–12) was introduced in 1984 and is the most uniform racer design, similar to the Junior Division kit racer introduced in 1976 in the US. Total weight allowance is 90 kg.
- Senior (ages 11–21) was created when the Junior was introduced. It has no restriction on body design, but over time has found favor with the lay-down configuration, similar to the Senior and Masters Division cars in the US. Weight allowance is 113 kg.
- Elite XL (age 13 and up) was introduced in 2006 and has similar body design to the Senior but for larger drivers. Weight allowance is 150 kg.
- DSKD-Open (age 7 and up) was introduced in 2014 for anyone wanting to get creative in the tradition of the Soap Box hand-built racers of Derby's early days. Weight allowance is 160 kg.

== Rules ==
One of Derby's first rules was that the car had to be "boy-built," without the assistance of an adult. This was seldom the case as most boys did require some help simply because they lacked the skills to perform such a feat, acquiring them eventually as the car was constructed while working with an adult. In the early days a boy was allowed assistance from a friend or other individual under the age of sixteen. To guarantee that boys strictly obeyed the rule, pre-race inspection of the car would have judges randomly ask that he demonstrate his knowledge of its construction if there was doubt about who actually built it. The rules also stipulated that the car must be driven by the boy that built it, though in the event that he came down with an illness or injury and was therefore unable to race, he was permitted to name a substitute driver to go in his place.

Race contestants at the local level were divided into two classes based on age: 9–12 raced as class B, 13–15 as class A. Each class declared a winner, who then raced each other in the final. That winner would be declared the overall Champion and become eligible to compete at the All-American in Akron as a representative of their home town. The class distinctions was replaced eventually by the three official divisions.

=== Construction ===
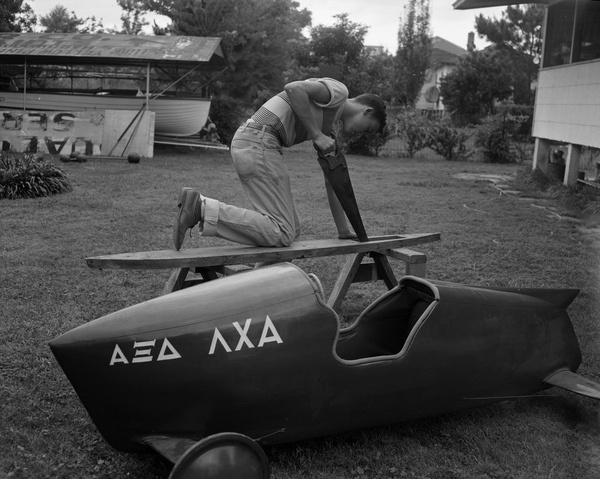
Tallahassee, Florida, racer Donnie Wilson building his car for the 1957 local race. In the foreground is his 1956 racer. He raced also in 1955, winning the Best Designed trophy.

Derby regulations regarding the construction of racers played an integral role in their design, since cars had to comply with size and weight restrictions. Excluding wheels, axles and assembly hardware, all cars were to be made of wood only. The maximum weight allowance was 250 lb (110 kg) for both car and driver (verified during a weigh-in prior to the race), the overall length no more than 80 inches (200 cm), a wheelbase no less than 40 inches (100 cm), height not to exceed 30 inches (76 cm) and a wheel tread of between 30 and 36 inches (76 and 91 cm). The front axle was to be mounted on a single kingpin, and directional control governed by steel cables, a single steering column and wheel. No ropes were allowed. The brake was to be a friction or drag type, usually an armature through the floor that was activated by a foot pedal. Wheels were to be the solid rubber type, not pneumatic, and measure no more than 12 inches (30 cm) in diameter, a limit that began in 1937. Finally the driver was to be seated upright, though the practice was to crouch forward to minimize wind resistance. Pre-race inspections verified that the car was well constructed according to strict observance of the rules, and safe to drive.

=== Clinics ===
The late thirties saw the emergence of Derby "clinics" being held in communities across the US and Canada, organized through various social institutions like the YMCA or at community centers or school gymnasiums. Attended by kids and their parents, the clinics were set up as informal gatherings meant to educate participants of the particulars of constructing and piloting a racer, sometimes offering practice time for the kids on an actual track. Here questions were asked and information was exchanged so that entrants would understand the regulations well enough to pass inspection on race day. Organizers would often have past Derby champs attend to offer their own words of advice, or indeed have their car, or multiple cars, there as well to demonstrate how a winner was built. It was often at these clinics that friendships between kids and families would begin, since they were by and large casual assemblages meant to introduce Soap Box Derby to, as well as attract, local youth.

Official Clinic Guides were published through the AASBD (Note: Official Clinic Guides from 1963, 1965 and 1968) to help organizers run standardized clinics, which were done routinely over several weeks, usually on a Sunday, in preparation for the big race, and in many communities were held annually for decades. Rochester, New York held its 25th annual clinic in 1962, the same year that Derby celebrated its own 25th Anniversary.

=== Restrictions ===
As governance increased and each year's Soap Box Derby Official Rules Book (Note: Sourced from the Soap Box Derby Official Rules Books from 1934 to 2000) was updated, restrictions were implemented to maintain safety. Windscreens were popular design features used since 1934 that helped improve streamlining and thus overall speed, so to limit that they were banned in 1948. They were permitted again in 1976 when they could be fitted on the new Junior-Division racers, but were dropped a year later. Between 2004 and 2014 they re-emerged at Ultimate Speed Challenge races, but have since been banned outright, no longer being permitted at any sanctioned Soap Box Derby race. In 1953 use of vertical-mounted steering columns was cut from the Official Rules Book, allowing horizontal columns only, though today's modern kits all run with standardized, pre-fabricated vertical steering columns. In 1965 lead and steel were permitted in the construction of the car, which was an asset in being able to add weight.

=== Rule change highlights by year ===
- 1934 – Cost limit of $10 per car, excluding wheels, axles
- 1936 – Bicycle wheels prohibited
- 1937 – Only 12-inch (30-centimetre) solid rubber wheels permitted
- 1939 – Weight limit of car alone set at 150 pounds (68 kg)
- 1940 – Added weight not part of the car's construction prohibited
- 1947 – Use of graphite on car or on driver's person prohibited
- 1948 – Tiller steering and windscreens prohibited
- 1949 – Use of power tools to construct car prohibited
- 1950 – After much protest, power tool use permitted
- 1950 – Laminate construction and pre-1948 wheels banned
- 1950 – Removable cockpit seat backs required
- 1951 – After much protest, laminate car construction permitted
- 1953 – Vertical steering columns prohibited
- 1954 – Wheel tampering i.e. drilling, painting prohibited
- 1957 – No evidence of tire or bearing tampering being tolerated
- 1958 – $15 cost limit per car; wheel enclosures of any kind prohibited
- 1959 – Use of lead anywhere in vehicle prohibited
- 1961 – Driver's eyes must be above front cowling when racing
- 1962 – Use of aluminum and sheet metal prohibited
- 1963 – Ownership of top-nine cars at All-American passed to AASBD
- 1964 – Lay-back or lay-down cars permitted
- 1966 – $30 cost limit per car, excluding wheels, axles and steering
- 1968 – Cable turnbuckles must be outside of car
- 1971 – Girls permitted to race; needle-nose cars prohibited
- 1972 – Steering column above car body prohibited
- 1973 – Wheels must be calibrated
- 1976 – Windscreens on new Junior Division kits cars permitted
- 1977 – Windscreens on all racers prohibited
- 1992 – Stock kit racer made mandatory
- 1994 – Super Stock kit racer made mandatory
- 1996 - Racers with disabilities now permitted to use hand brake in place of required foot brake.
- 2000 – Masters kit racer made mandatory

== Race format ==
At Derby's inaugural race in 1934 as many as five cars raced at once in a single heat, but this ended for safety reasons with the introduction of lanes. For decades cars raced in two or three lanes in single elimination heats, meaning once a racer lost, they were out of the contest. As early as the late fifties the double elimination format began being used. (Note: The Motorless Hot Rod Derby, an unsanctioned event in Bend, OR ran double-elimination races in 1959) With Derby Downs' mandate to further level the competitive playing field following the '73 scandal, the double-elimination format was instituted at the Beacon Journal local Akron race in 1974. Eventually the 'double-elimination, timer swap' was introduced. In it two competitors would exchange their wheels with each other, trade lanes and race again. Most Derby participants knew which lane was the better, and in the past a coin toss would often determine which kid got which, which meant that fate and not competitiveness would determine an outcome, a contentious issue for some parents. The upside of such a lengthy format was that every kid got at least two shots at competing, getting more use out of a car that took months to build. An example is 1982 Akron Senior Champion John Esque, who lost his first heat, only to defeat every contender after that and came out on top in the final.

It was also made policy that no one car should have an advantage of better wheels over another, so swaps become mandatory. The downside of the new format was that this added still more heats to the elimination process. John Knox, 1956 Akron, OH Champion and a second-of-third-generation Derby family member stated in 1983 "It may be dull as dishwater for the spectators," due to the slower pace of determining a winner, but fairer "for the kids." Lane and wheel swaps are standard practice today.

== Car design ==
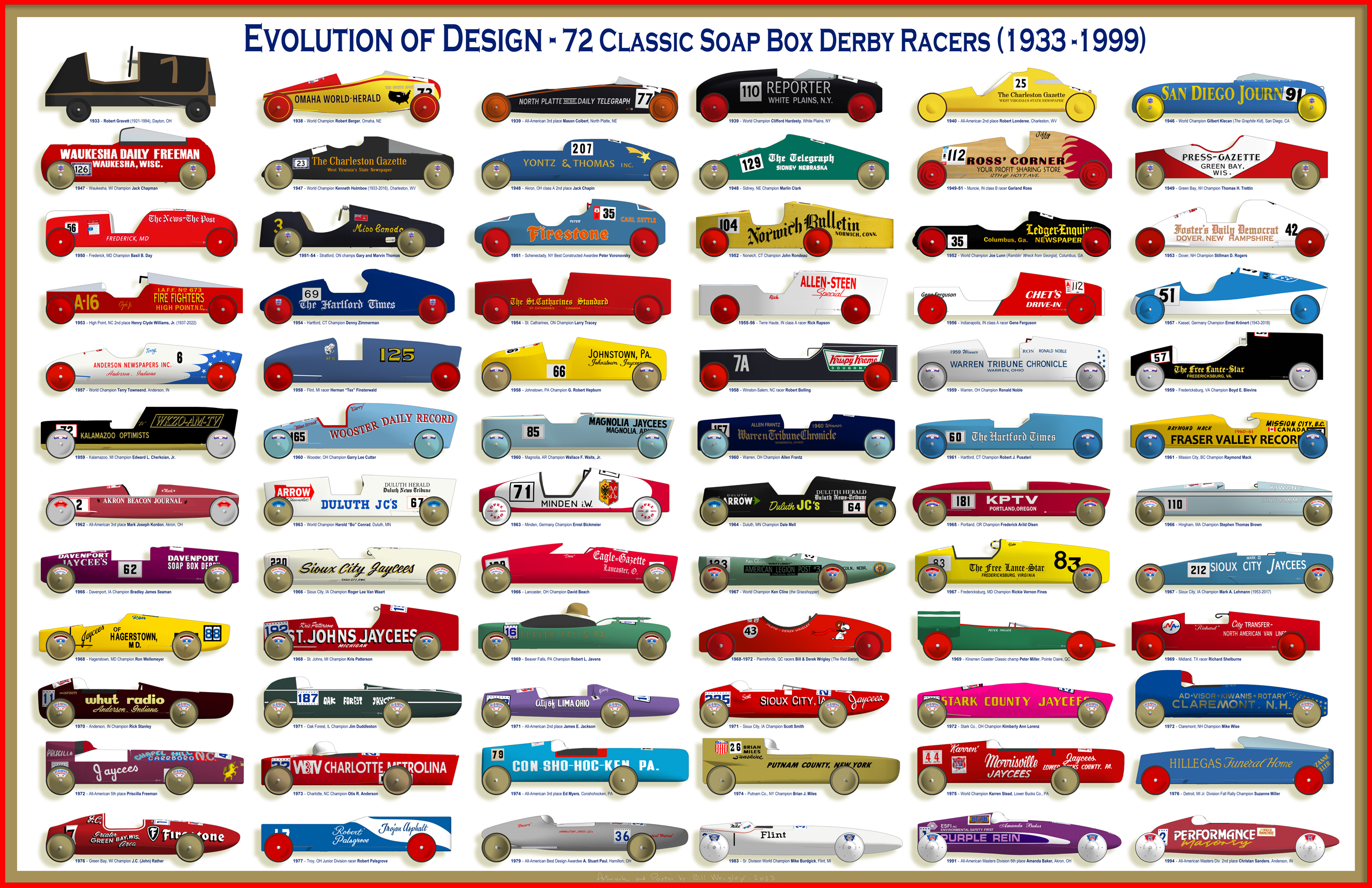
Evolution of Design: Side profiles of racers (to scale) from 1933 to 1994

Design and construction of a Soap Box Derby car usually reflected the skills of the kid that built it, and as time passed each iteration with each new generation benefited from the previous on how a car would look. Before the introduction of kit cars in 1976, all cars were one-of-a kind creations, some looking particularly unique in their experimentation with form and function. Like any evolutionary process (pictured), if innovations were successful at the track they were passed on.

=== Sit-up cars ===
The majority of Soap Box Derby racers were—and remain—cars piloted by occupants in the sit-up position, and before 1964 was the only method allowed by the rules. Having not yet acquired the skills, boys usually learned as they went, building simple-to-construct, boxy designs—plywood or metal skin, even fabric, over a bulkhead/floorboard framework. As cars became less boxy and more curvaceous, other techniques were used to smooth out the body lines such as papier-mâché and chicken wire, which were among the many options suggested in the Official Rules Book. Construction of this type produced cars that performed well at races including the All-American, with some taking World Champion.

Examples of basic sit-ups that won in Akron are Darwin Cooper (Note: Image Darwin Cooper's 1951 World Championship car) of Williamsport, Pennsylvania, who took the All-American in 1951, and Harold "Bo" Conrad (Note: Image of Harold Conrad's 1963 World Champion car) from Duluth, Minnesota, who did the same in 1963.

==== Laminate cars ====
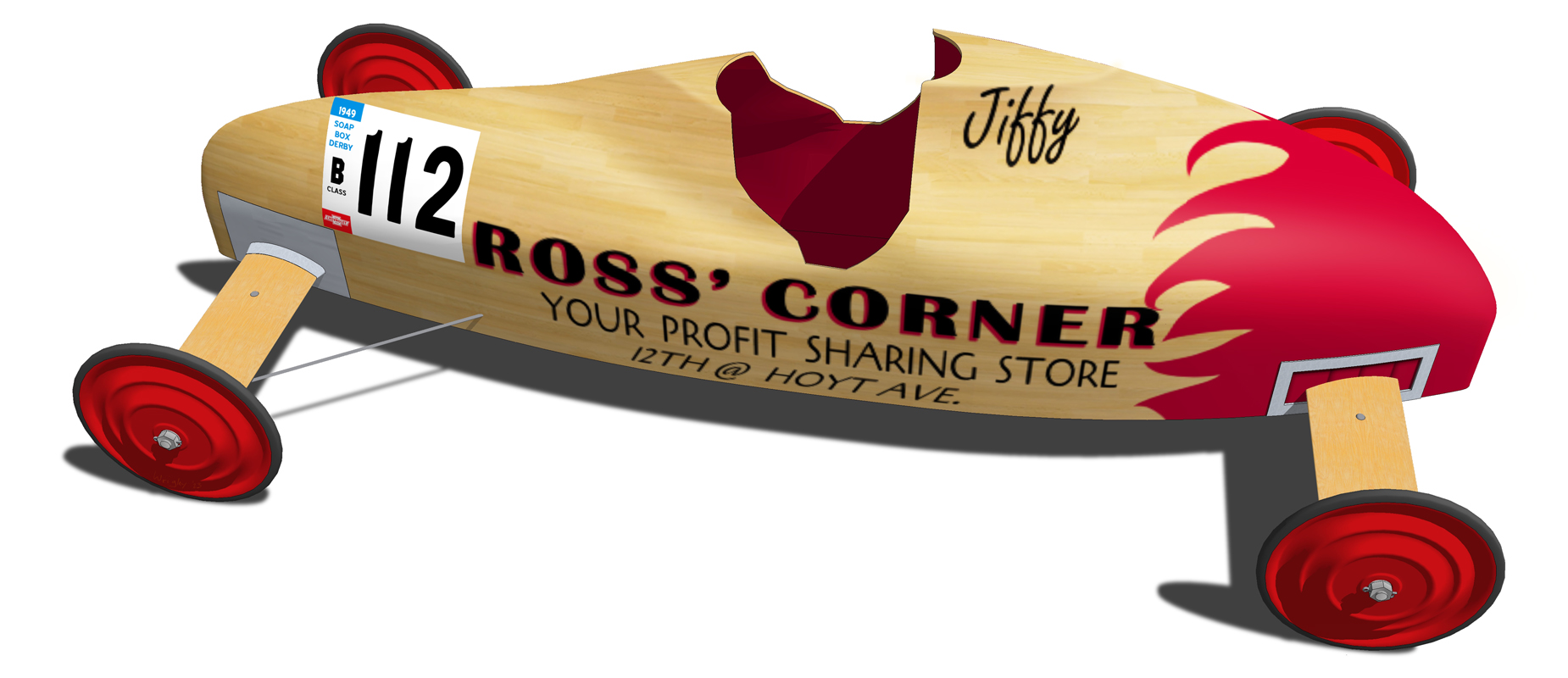
A laminate-constructed car piloted by 1949–51 Muncie, Indiana class B racer Garland Ross Jr.

Boys learned to build more sophisticated racers that took aerodynamics into consideration, with the result being more streamlined designs. To achieve this the more skillful entries were made from laminate construction, sandwiching multiple layers of lumber laid horizontally or vertically and held together with fasteners or glue. The intent was to create a sturdy hollow shell in the shape a car, the hollow cavity meant to accommodate the driver and various control mechanisms like the brake and steering. Once the glue had cured the outside of the shell had to be hewn into a more precise aerodynamic shape, using a hand plane or saw, then sanded smooth until the final form was achieved. With floorboards as thick as four inches, these cars ended up being considerably heavy, which was a useful advantage when smaller drivers needed the additional weight. Though time-consuming it was a technique used successfully by skilled builders, but "next to impossible," as stated by Myron Scott in 1950, for most boys. Derby Downs felt that its use placed an unfair advantage over other kids building the more common, boxy designs, so in 1950 banned its use. The following year the rule was rescinded, and laminates continued being built as late as 1970.

Examples of laminate construction are found in cars piloted by Thomas Fisher (Note: Image of 1940 World Champion Thomas Fisher with his laminate-construction car) of Detroit, Michigan, who won the All-American in 1940, Garland Ross Jr. (pictured) of Muncie, Indiana, who raced as a class B entry from 1949 to 1951, Donald Klepsch (Note: Image of 1949 Detroit, Michigan Champion Donald Klepsch's laminate-construction car at the Inaugural Vintage Derby Car Show in Akron, Ohio, 2022) of Detroit, Michigan who won his local in 1949, and William Smith who took the Mobile, Alabama, championship in 1964.

==== Sight grooves and other sixties innovations ====
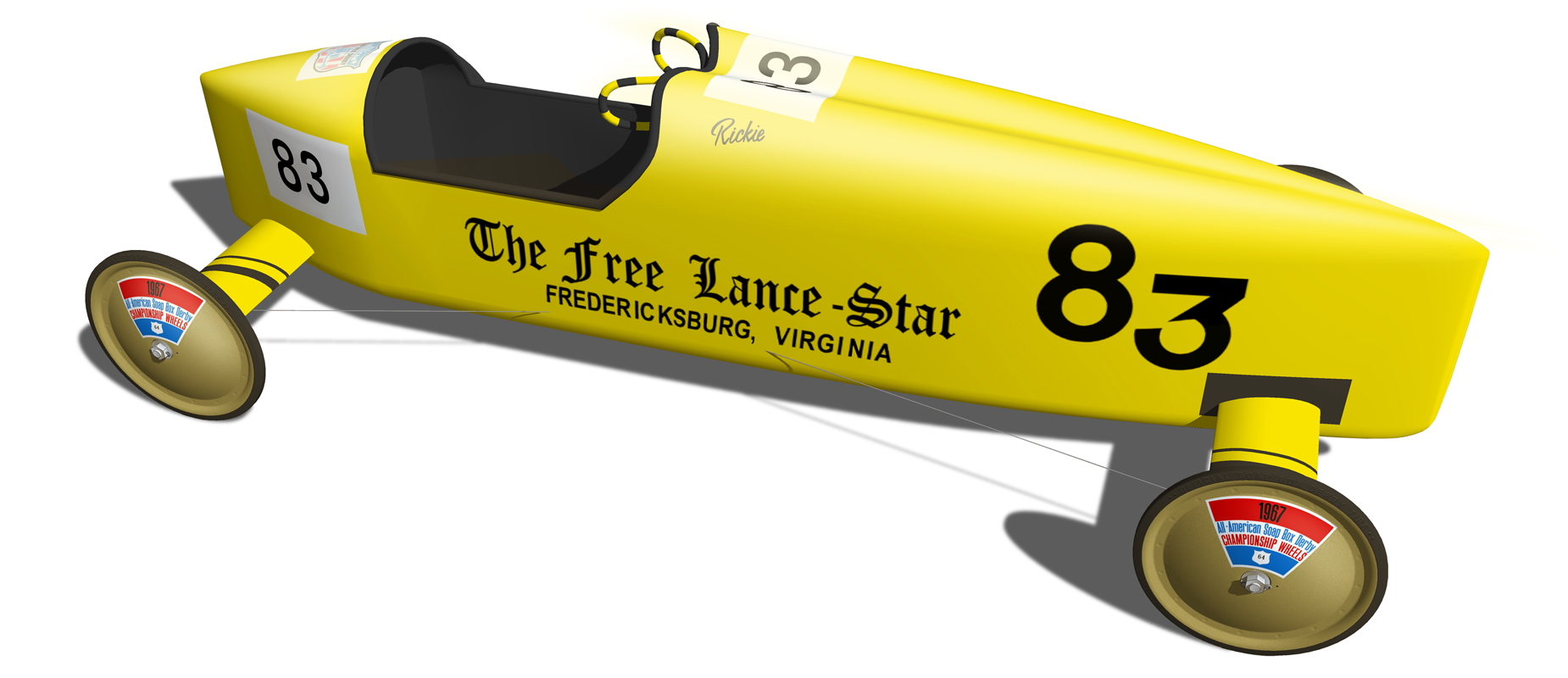
A "cleft" or "sight groove" sit-up car piloted in 1967 by Fredericksburg, Virginia Champion Rickie Vernon Fines

Peculiar innovations appearing from the late-fifties to the late-sixties were cars fitted with clefts (pictured) or depressions running axially along the fore-deck, called "sight-grooves", (Note: Image of 1970 Warren, OH Champion Kevin Lamb's car with sight grooves) through which drivers could see ahead while slumped low in the cockpit. Other innovations saw the front axles being placed further aft in an attempt to place as much weight of the car rearward, meaning as high up the hill from the finish line, to gain even a hundredth of a second advantage. 1967 World Champion Ken Cline's low-profile racer, called "the Grasshopper", (Note: Image of 1967 World Champion Ken Cline with his car) was the first World Champion with a car configured in this way. Andy Killian, a competitor from Hickory, North Carolina talked about experimenting with buckshot hidden in a cavity of his floorboard, an idea from "backyard engineer" Bill Cockerham, whose son Mark won the Hickory local in 1968. The theory was that as the car ran down the hill, the loose shot would roll forward first, which would end up pushing the car. The results were inconclusive.

Cockpit tonneau covers were also being added to enclose a larger boy's back and shoulders, which usually protruded slightly outside the car body, in an attempt to improve aerodynamics. With boys that raced for more than one year and began to outgrow their cars, side blisters would sometimes be fitted to accommodate shoulders or elbows that were becoming restricted.

==== Shotgun steering ====
An unusual innovation came in 1965 with "shotgun steering", a design solution in response to a regulation stipulating that the steering column be situated 12 inches (300 mm) above the floor of the car. Many cars by then were being built lower than that, so the column had to be placed above and outside the car body, which ended up looking like a machine gun on a WWI fighter, and thus its name. Examples of cars fitted with this type of steering were 1965 Lynchburg, Virginia Champion John McDaniels III, 1970 World Champion Sam Gupton of Durham, North Carolina, (Note: Image of 1970 World Champion Sam Gupton in his car at the starting line) and 1971 World Champion Larry Blair of Oroville, California. (Note: Image of 1971 World Champion Larry Blair with his car) Shotgun steering was banned in 1972.

=== Lay-down cars ===
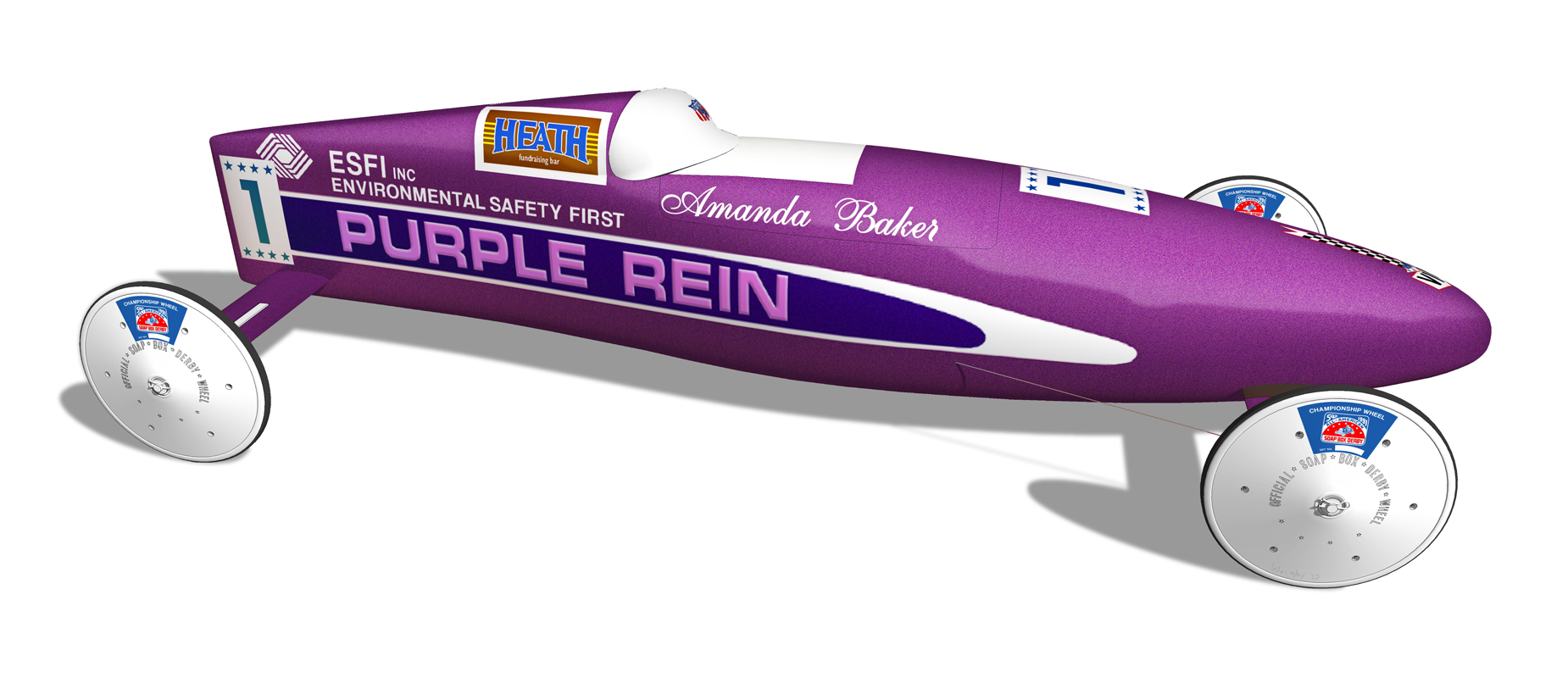
A "lay-down" car by 1991 by Akron, Ohio Masters Champion Amanda Baker

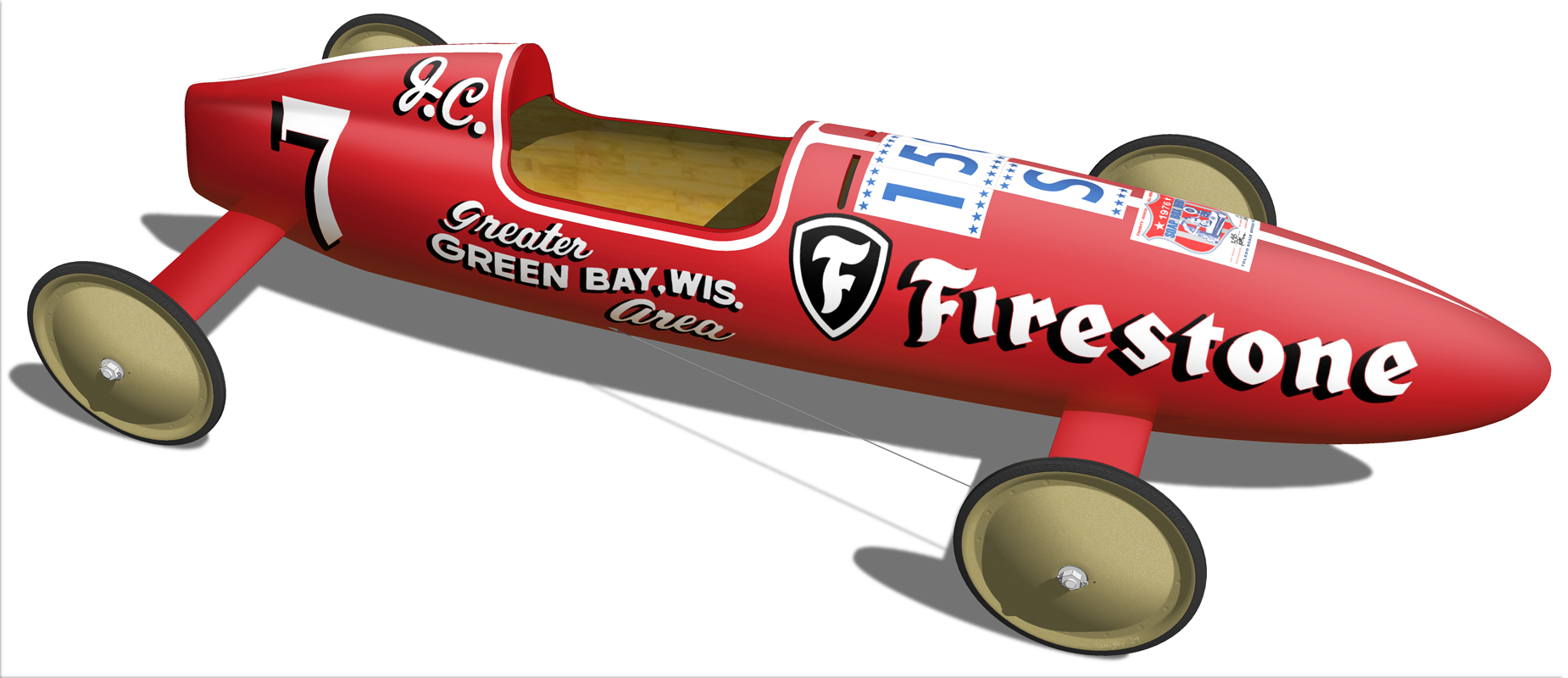
A "stick-car" by 1976 Green Bay, Wisconsin Sr. Champion J. C. (John) Rather

In 1964 the first lay-back or lay-down designs were appearing on the track, this to improve performance by minimizing aerodynamic drag. By the early seventies they had become status-quo for the most competitive cars, with 1969 being the first year that a lay-down design won the World Championship, piloted by Steve Souter (Note: Image of 1969 World Champion Steve Souter's car) of Midland, Texas.

An example of a lay-down car (pictured) is that of Amanda Baker, who won the Akron (Metro), Ohio Masters Championship in 1991.

==== Stick cars ====
With the lay-downs came composite materials being incorporated into their construction, quite similar to wooden strip-built canoes laminated with fiberglass, called "stick car" construction. Though a challenge to undertake because of the complex curvature of the body shell, which usually comprised a rounded bottom and headrest fairing, this technique became quite popular with experienced build-teams wanting to create small aerodynamic body shells that snugly enclosed the driver. Beginning in the seventies it was used almost exclusively to build the Senior and later Masters Division racers, and is still being used today to construct Legacy Division entries at the All-American, praised for its emphasis on individuality, innovation and creativity.

Examples of stick-cars are found in those piloted by Craig Kitchen (Note: Image of 1979 Senior World Champion Craig Kitchen's car) from Akron, Ohio who was crowned World Champion in 1979, and 1976 Green Bay, Wisconsin Sr. Champion J. C. (John) Rather (pictured), who won the Best Constructed Award at the 39th All-American.

==== Masters sit-ups ====
From 1992 to 1998 many Masters Division competitors were dominating on the track with cars build in the traditional sit-up configuration, which up to this point saw only lay-down cars as Masters entries. Prior to this the last sit-up that won the All-American was Branch Lew in 1968. (Note: Image of 1968 World Champion Branch Lew in his sit-up racer) Bonnie Thornton (Note: Image of Bonnie Thornton with her 1992 Masters World Championship sit-up racer) of Las Vegas, Nevada, was the first Masters World Champion in a sit-up car in 1992, and James Marsh (Note: Image of James Marsh with his 1998 Masters World Championship sit-up racer) of Cleveland, Ohio, was the last in 1998 and last to ever win in a sit-up as of 2023. Danielle DelFarraro (Note: Image of Danielle DelFarraro with her 1994 Masters World Championship racer) of Akron, Ohio, who took the Masters World Championship in 1994 in a sit-up car, was the first back-to-back winner at the All-American after her 1993 world title in the Kit Division.

== Kit cars ==
=== Wood kits ===
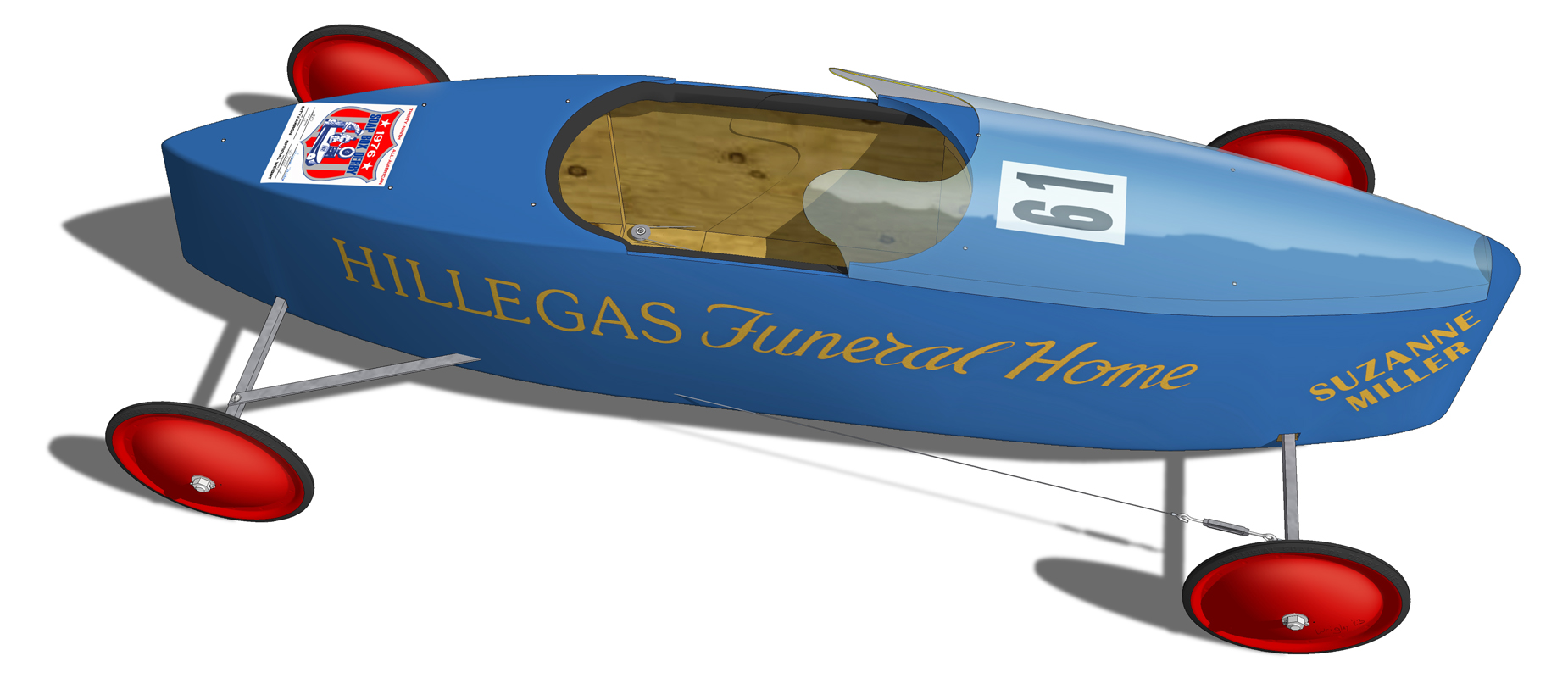
A wooden kit car from 1976 piloted by Suzanne Miller. Note the exposed axles with rear braces.

Kits debuted with the introduction of Junior Division in 1976 when Novar Electronics became the new sponsor. Purchased from the AASBD, they came with instructions and hardware only, with the builder supplying their own construction material, which was wood. This gave kids an easier way to construct a car, a "back-to-basics" initiative that held firm to Derby Down's "kid-built" rule while benefiting financially from their sale. They retailed for $36.95. Measurement remained roughly the same, with an overall length of 80 inches (200 cm). Unlike previous racers, the axles were kept exposed—without aerodynamic airfoils—and came with stabilizer braces or radius rods for the rear axle. The kit instructions offered several body designs from which to choose, but the general configuration was a flat-top car with a teardrop-shaped floor board, to which were affixed squared wooden bulkheads enclosed in a plywood skin. A standardized steering wheel was included in the kit. Windscreens were also permitted in 1976 on the kits only, but were discontinued the following year.

Examples of wood kits are racers piloted by Suzanne Miller (pictured) who won the Flint, Michigan Fall Junior Rally Championship in 1976, and Phil Raber (Note: Image of Phil Raber's 1976 Junior World Championship car) who was the first Junior World Champion in a kit car the same year.

=== Fiberglass and plastic shell kits ===
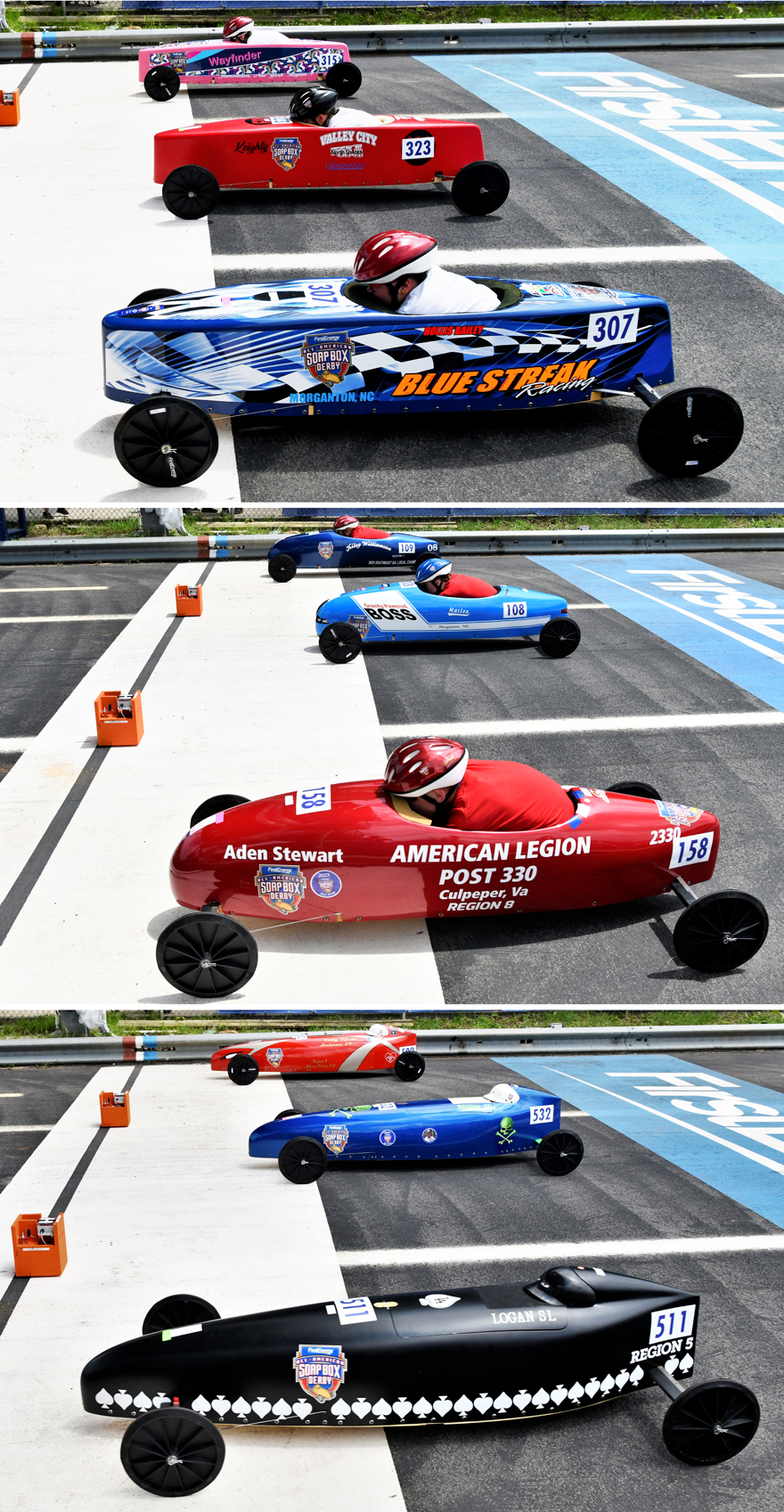
Top to bottom, the three official kits: Stock, Super Stock and Masters.

The introduction of the fiber glass and plastic shell kits served two purposes: making construction of a car less of a hindrance for kids that till now had to construct one from scratch, and provide the All-American with a more sizable cash-flow from their sales. Kits purchased from Derby Downs after 1992 comprised a body shell (one- or two-piece) composed of ABS, a common thermoplastic polymer, for the Stock, and LLDPE, a flexible plastic, for the Super Stock. Included also was a finished floorboard that came pre-cut, painted and drilled, complete hardware including the brake and steering assembly, cables, pulleys and fasteners, and detailed assembly instructions. Wheels and axles were purchased separately.

==== Junior and Stock ====
In 1981 the first fiber glass "shell" kits debuted at the All-American, which were complete pre-fabricated car bodies made from two-halves that would shave 10 to 15 hours off building a wooden car, though many contestants continued to use wood. As enrollment in the Derby continued to dwindle due to the complexity of building a racer, Ken Cline and 1971 Bay City, Michigan Champion Mark Packard, founders of the Greater Chicago Soap Box Derby, got to work with a team on creating an easy-to-build, one-piece shell kit that simplified the building process for kids lacking a workshop. Packard worked on the design while Cline built prototypes that would be presented to the All-American. According to them it could be assembled by a kid in an apartment in as little as four hours with few tools. The design was accepted, and in 1992 debuted as the official Stock Division racer, replacing the Junior, and made mandatory. The move, which "saved the Derby," according to officials, attracted new kids and contributed to Derby Downs' coffers. For their contribution, Cline and Packard were inducted into the AASBD Hall of Fame in 2017.

==== Super Stock ====
1994 saw the debut of the Super Stock Division, with a two-piece shell comprising a top and bottom section of a brand new design replacing the previous Kit Car Division. Mounted atop a flat floorboard, the completely curvilinear, teardrop-shaped shell was made wider and had a larger cockpit opening to accommodate the bigger kids. It comprised a rounded nose, tapered tail, and featured a sight groove on the fore deck, the only design of the shell kits to be so equipped. Like the Stock kit, it could be assembled in as little as four hours. Replacing the Kit Car with the Super Stock meant that the only scratch-built entry remaining in 1994 was the Masters.

==== Masters ====
The final kit intended for the Masters Division, the "Scottie Special," debuted in 1999 as a full lay-down design with flat bottom and headrest fairing, and required eight to twelves hours to assemble. Announced in 1998 by Derby general manager Jeff Iula, it was named in honor of founder Myron Scott, who was among the first group of inductees at the AASBD Hall Of Fame in 1997. Scott died the following year.

== Running gear ==
Soap Box Derby cars comprised two main components, the car body itself, usually made entirely from wood and sometimes sheet metal or other flexible material, later fiber glass, and the running gear (wheels, axles and suspension) comprising pre-fabricated metal components from a wide variety of sources. In 1937 rules began establishing what could and could not be used.

=== Suspension ===
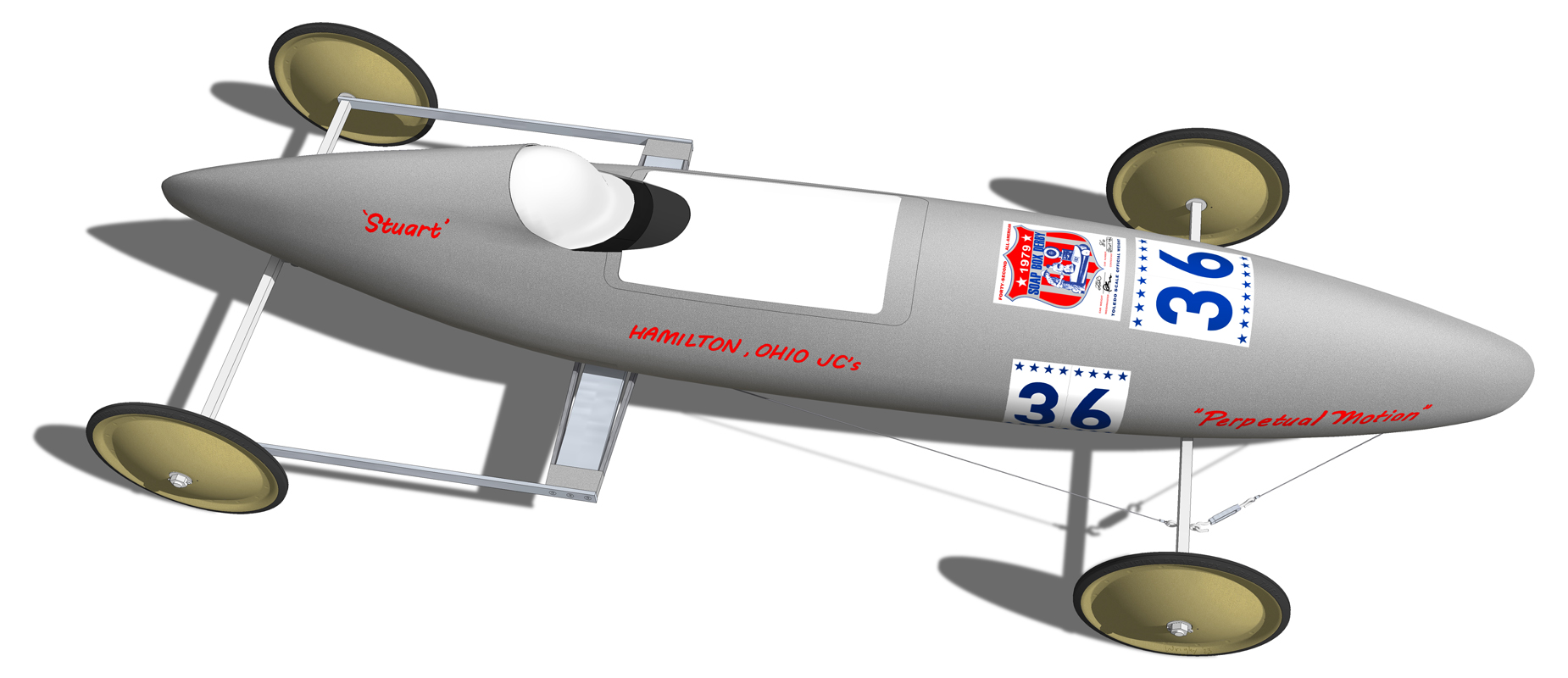
A unique suspension on a car driven by 1979 Hamilton, Ohio Senior Champion Stuart Paul, which had no axletrees, and "kite steering" (front cables)

By the late 1930s most cars had axles running through the car body rather than underneath, bolted to the topside of the floorboard. Flexibility of the axle bar helped dampen vibrations from the effects of imperfections on the track's surface like cracks, and counter undulations of the pavement. Wooden axletrees fitted over the axles were also permitted to act as aerodynamic airfoils that streamlined the car as well as spread the car's weight evenly over the axle's length. A variation on this was the "Akron Four-Point Suspension", where the axletrees would concentrate the car's weight at the end of the axles, alleviating their tendency to bow in the middle while under load. Axles could also be pre-bowed or arced to counter this, with the ends bent downward slightly, making the wheels camber outward at the top (positive camber). When the driver's weight was added the arc would flatten, straightening the wheels so they would sit perpendicular to the ground.

More complex suspension designs that were suggested in the Official Rules Book were the 'rubber-ball suspension,' using a ball mounted atop the front axle as a spring cushion, and the 'springboard suspension,' where a diving-board-type device fitted in much the same way yielded similar results. 1969 Sheboygan, Wisconsin Champion Michael Benishek, 15, used a coil-type suspension of his own design on both axles, and was awarded Best-Innovation in the technical category along with his competitive win. A unique suspension was found on 1979 Hamilton, OH Senior Champion Stuart Paul's car (pictured), winning the Best Design Award when he competed at the 42nd All-American. His suspension comprised torsion bars fitted transversely through the car body, with trailing arms connected to a free-floating real axle that ran underneath. That year the rules stipulated that axles remain exposed on the Senior Division cars like they were on the Juniors. In response, builders installed taught wires between the nose of the car and the front wheels, called "kite steering" (pictured) to improve aerodynamics that were lost when airfoils over the axles were disallowed.

==== Solid, tight or loose ====
To this day the tightness settings of the fasteners between the axles and floorboard continue to be experimented with in various combinations to achieve maximum performance of the car. These include tightening the fasteners so they allow no movement whatsoever (called 'solid'), a slight amount of play ('tight') or free movement ('loose').

=== Wheels ===
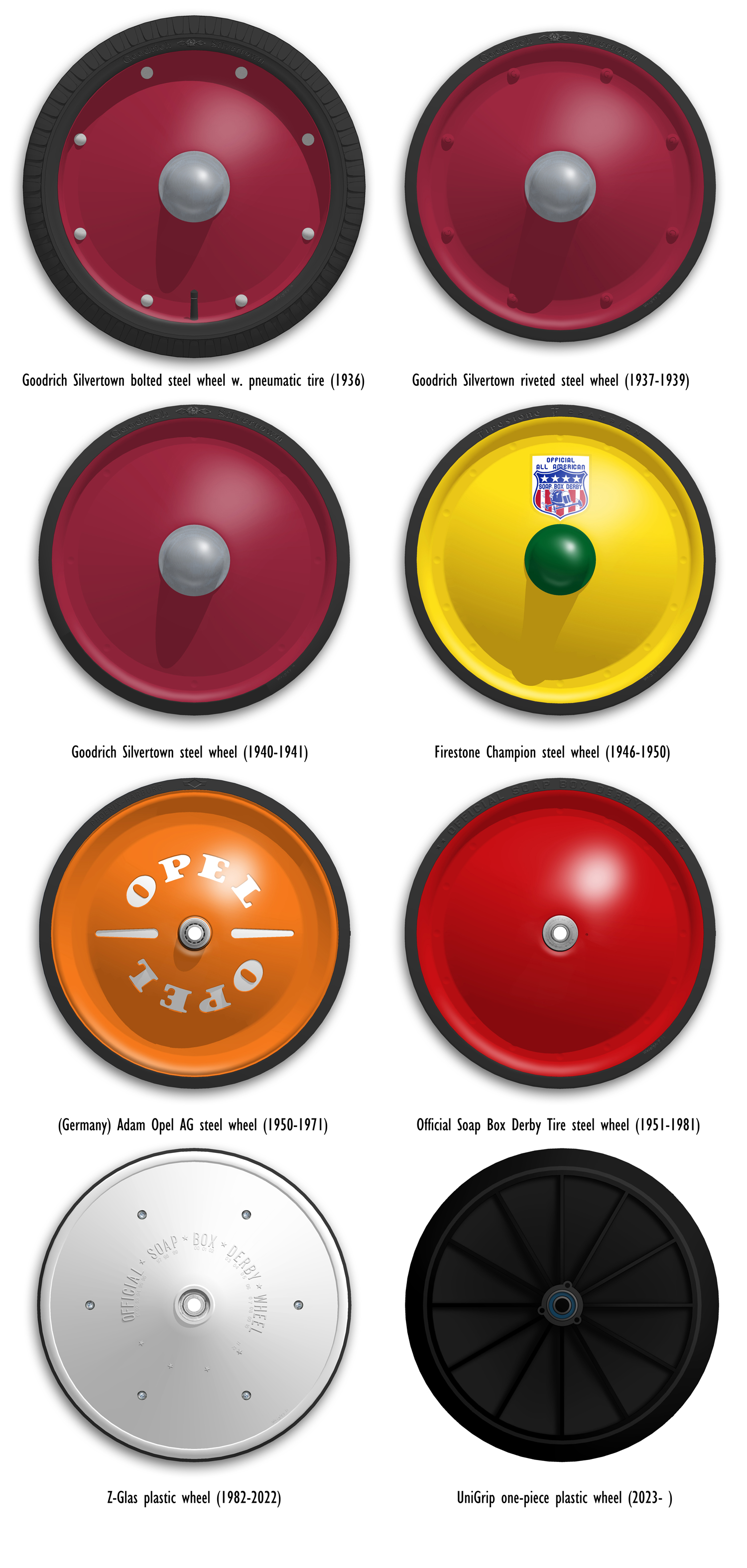
Soap Box Derby wheels from 1936 to 2023. With the exception of the pneumatic wheel (upper left), all wheels were fitted with a solid rubber tire, and measured 12 inches (30 cm). The Opel wheel—seen here in orange with white letters, though it was painted many colors—was official issue for races in Germany.

The first years of the Derby saw any sort of wheel that a boy could get his hands on to complete, since rules did not stipulate restrictions before 1937. These included scrap wheels sourced from automobiles, baby carriages, bicycles, roller skates and wagons, arranged in a tricycle or quad-configuration. Randy Custer won the Dayton city-wide race in 1933 on three wheels.

==== Pneumatic steel wheel (1936) ====
In 1936 wheels, bearing and axles were the first components of the car to become standardized with the introduction of the Goodrich Silvertown steel wheel. Purchased as a set of four, the two-part bolted wheels came with ball-type bearings and dustcaps and were fitted with a pneumatic tire measuring 15 by 1.75 inches (38.1 cm × 4.4 cm). Though they were not required on the car to compete—as many boys still used scrap wheels, they were used successfully by Herbert Muench (Note: Image of 1936 World Champion Herbert Muench's car) of St. Louis, Missouri, who won the 1936 World Championship.

==== Riveted steel wheels (1937–1941) ====
In 1937 the official rule book stipulated a limit on wheel size of no more than 12 inches (30 cm)—a standard still used to this day—and a requirement that the tire be solid, not pneumatic. In compliance Goodrich Silvertown introduced Derby's first official-issue wheel, made available for sale to within the $4–$6.00 budget set by Derby officials. Like the previous year they comprised two steel halves—this time riveted together, soon to be replaced by welds—and came in a kit that included axles measuring 9/16 inch (14 mm). Wheel-sets were often in short supply in the early years, and many suppliers took advantage of this by advertising after-market "Derby-type" wheels for sale in newspapers at a cheaper price, or to fill the gap when official issue were unavailable.

==== Opel wheel (1950–1971) ====
Races in Germany, called the Deutschen Seifenkisten Derby or DSKD, were sponsored by Adam Opel AG, who provided the wheels for German kids, and were only used there. The robust Opel steel wheel (pictured right) measured a slightly larger 30.5 centimetres and was used from 1950 to 1971. This was replaced by the lighter Swiss wheel, which measured 29 centimeters. In 1984 the DSKD metal wheel was introduced by the German Soapbox Derby e.V., manufactured by Mefro Wheels. German champs that raced at the All-American had their wheels replaced with those used in the US.

==== Official Soap Box Derby Tire red steel wheel (1951–1981) ====
In 1946 a new wheel, the Firestone Champion, was introduced that measured the same 12 in (300 mm) diameter and was painted yellow with green dust cap. A decal with the official Derby logo appeared on the obverse side of the wheel. The following year it was painted gold, again with the decal affixed, but the dust cap was dropped. In 1948 the popular red wheel was introduced, and by 1950 the rules stated that all cars had to use them, with nothing prior to 1948 being allowed. In 1951 it was re-branded the "Official Soap Box Derby Tire", this time with no decal, and became the official issue at all Derby events until 1981.

==== Z-glas plastic wheel (1982–2022) ====
In 1981 a new plastic 12 1/4-inch (310 mm) wheel was introduced, the white Z-Glas, developed by the AASBD technical organization and Derby's national sponsor Novar Electronic Corporation. Made of high-density linear polyethylene with a polyurethane tire, it was discovered to have structural problems, with reports of failure on the track, and was felt at the time that the issue was with the design and not the plastic. Later research kept the design but tested twenty different types of plastics, settling on DuPont Zytel, made of 43% fiber glass filled nylon and, according to Novar's James Ott, the "strongest plastic made." The tire was also of a higher-traction urethane compound. It required assembly of the two hubs, then addition of the tread.

Replacing the steel wheel was done to offset its high cost, which was priced at $80.00 a set, while the new plastic issue would be $44.00. Because the wheel hubs were cast rather than pressed steel plate they were discovered to be more uniform, making wheel calibration of a set much less time-consuming due to their limited variation. After the wheel was deemed safe it was released for sale for the 1992 race season, and used successfully for forty-one years.

In Germany the Z-Glas was introduced in the 1990s as the DSKD plastic wheel.

==== UniGrip one-piece wheel (2023– ) ====
In 2023 the Z-glas was replaced by the new UniGrip, a black plastic, all-in-one-piece molded wheel and tire measuring the standard 12 inches (30 cm). The hubs of the new wheel are made of fiber-reinforced Nylon resin, similar to the wheel it replaced. The tread is made of thermoplastic polyurethane (TPU). "Molding of the one-piece hub-and-tread wheel eliminates the possibilities of variations by manual assembly during the production process, thereby increasing the consistency and stability of the end product," said Bret Treier, board chairman of International Soap Box Derby. The wheel debuted at the 83rd All-American in July 2023, and are priced at $225.00 for a set.

=== Wheel performance ===
It was quickly understood that the way to victory relied largely on the wheels, and several clever means, some legal, some not, were used to exploit this. Wheel and axle sets came new out of the box when purchased, so competitors had to implement various methods of breaking in the bearings, either by hand or mechanically, over a long period until optimal spinning performance was achieved. A variety of lubricants was also experimented with, along with a common practice prior to 1954 of drilling small holes in the metal fascia to balance a wheel. According to Jeff Iula, 1953 World Champion Fred Mohler "rolled down the hill on wheels drilled out and looked like Swiss cheese." Other more interesting ways of attempting to improve performance involved the rubbing of dry ice on the rubber tire to harden it, with the expectation that this would reduce rolling resistance. 1954 World Champion Dick Kemp learned during multiple test runs that as the day warmed up and with it the wheels, times improved. At the 17th All-American when most competitors used dry ice, he was heating his wheels by reflecting sunlight onto them. According to David Fulton, author of Winning Ingredients for Soap Box Derby Racers, the recommend practice on race day is to keep the car parked in the sun and over dark pavement so that the radiant heat will warm the wheels and rubber on them, improving times. A warmer car is also more flexible, which also improves performance.

=== Commemorative wheels ===
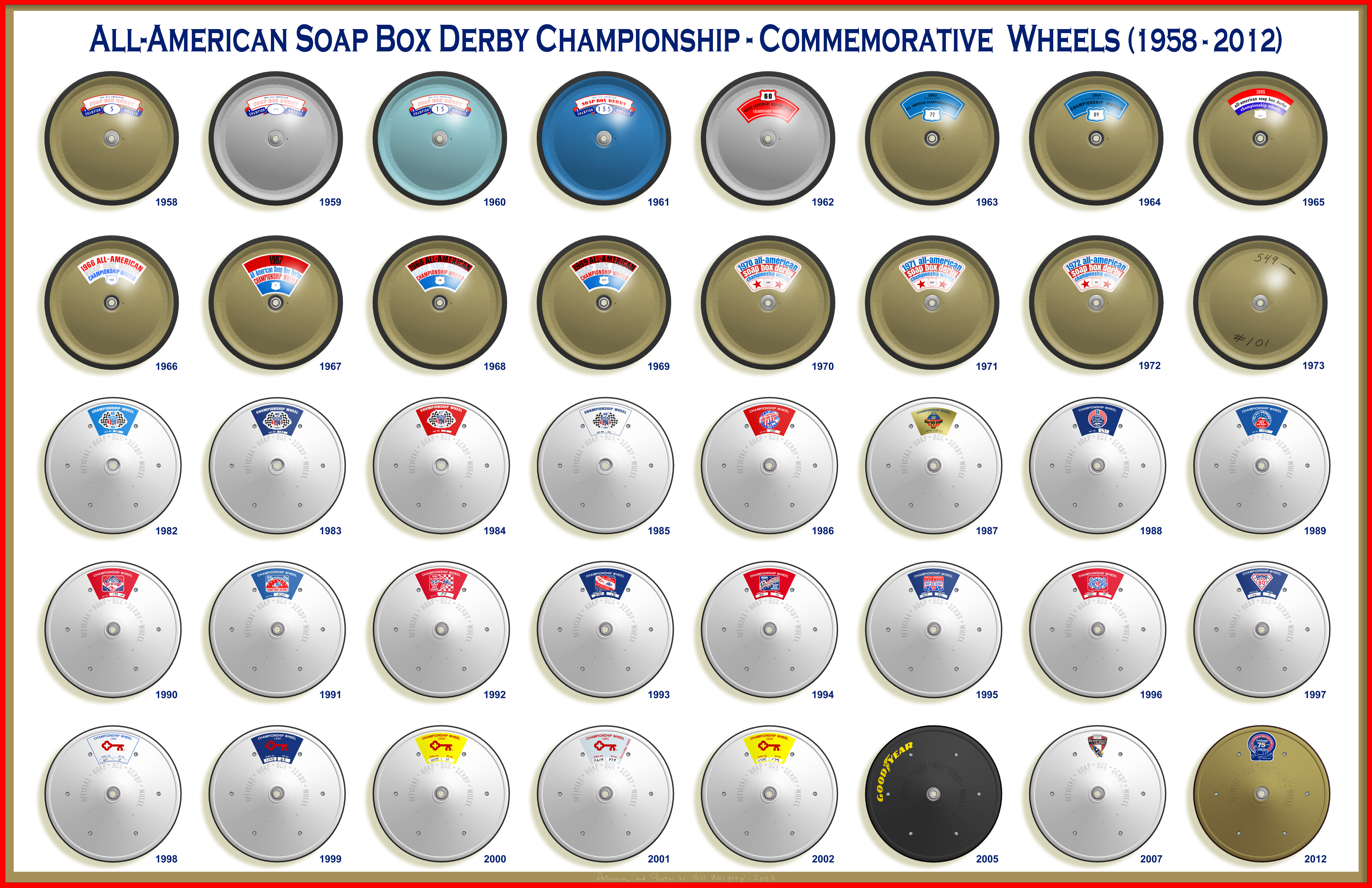
Championship wheels(1958–2012) commemorating each All-American

In 1958 Derby Downs began issuing commemorative Championship wheels (pictured) at the All-American, meaning every car had their original wheels replaced with the brand new set, to "eliminate any type of hedging." This practice continued until 1972, with each year's wheel having a unique color—gold (1958), silver (1959), robin-egg (1960), blue (1961), silver (1962–25th anniversary) and gold (1962–1972)—with matching water-slide decals on the obverse and reverse side, each year bearing a unique commemorative design. When Chevrolet dropped its sponsorship in 1972, the wheel, which now came in a calibrated set, continued to be painted gold but no longer had the decal. In 1982 the decals returned, this time on the obverse side only of the new Z-glas wheel, and again with a design unique to a particular year, but ended in 2002. 1998 was the first time that Derby Downs allowed a sponsor, in this case KeyBank, to feature their corporate logo on the commemorative wheel decals, which was done for five years. Goodyear's sponsorship beginning in 1998 had its logo on a signature Z-Glas wheel in black plastic. Further commemorative wheels were issued at the 70th All-American (2007), with title sponsor Levi Strauss Signature on the decal, and the 75th (2012), showing the logo for title sponsor FirstEnergy.

=== Calibrated wheels and wheel banks ===
In 1973, Derby Downs instituted wheel matching or calibrating as part of their new policy. In the early years contestants owned their own set or sets of wheels, which they could work on to maximize performance, sometimes bending the rules to gain an advantage. After the 1973 cheating scandal the idea of eliminating such an advantage become mandated with the introduction of wheel matching and calibrating. This was carried out on a wheel tester designed by Robert Cooper of All-American Derby Control Board and Jack Morran, chairman of the National Derby's Inspection Committee. In 1974, 576 wheels were tested over four days, with the data being collected sent to Charlotte, North Carolina where it was tallied on a computer. Results were sent back to Akron, where race officials divided the wheels into 144 sets that were as perfectly matched as possible. Each wheel was identified with markings showing set number and direction of rotation, and kept in a "wheel bank," from which racers would draw lots to determine which set they would receive on the morning of race day. After the race the wheels were returned to the "bank" to be used the following year. Wheel banks were being set up as early as 1971 as a means of making wheels available to kids who were unsponsored and did not have funds to purchase new wheels. To ensure they were evenly matched, a wheel tester, which simulated real road conditions on a small scale, was created. The general opinion was that having every kid receive wheels that were as evenly matched with every other kids' would put "the fate of the race in the driver's hands," eliminating the wheel as a deciding factor on race outcome. While wheel banks continue being use today, management of them from among the numerous local organizers can vary, and depending on their upkeep and calibrating methods could still mean a racer might, though luck, receive a bad set.

=== Wheel swaps ===
To further eliminate advantages of any one driver blessed with a good set of wheels over one stuck with a bad one, the practice of wheel swapping was introduced. Wheel swaps involve two competitors each selecting two wheels from their opponents car and having them put on their own, called a two-wheel "swap-off," then racing again. There was also a four-wheel swap-off or various combinations of two- and four-wheel swaps. Lane swapping was also implemented, again eliminating any advantages through luck. The practice of wheel swapping continues to this day in concert with lane swapping in double-elimination races. and is deemed most fair among racing families, though the initiative has received criticism for making races take too long.

== Car specifications ==
Measurements of Derby cars from 1934 to 2001, indicating maximum or minimum allowances
| Year | Car type | Overall length (max.), incl. wheels | Overall width (max.) | Overall height (max.) | Wheelbase (min.) from center of each spindle | Ground clearance (min.) incl. break pad | Weight of car and driver (max.) |
|---|---|---|---|---|---|---|---|
| 1934 | Sit-up | none specified | 42 inches (110 cm) | 34 inches (86 cm) | none specified | none specified | 250 pounds (110 kg) |
| 1937–1971 | Sit-up | 80 inches (200 cm) | 40 inches (100 cm) | 24 inches (61 cm) | 48 inches (120 cm) | 3 inches (7.6 cm) | 250 pounds (110 kg) |
| 1964–1971 | Lay-down | 80 inches (200 cm) | 40 inches (100 cm) | 24 inches (61 cm) | 48 inches (120 cm) | 3 inches (7.6 cm) | 250 pounds (110 kg) |
| 1972–1998 | Lay-down/Senior/Masters | 84 inches (210 cm) | 40 inches (100 cm) | 28 inches (71 cm) | 65 inches (170 cm) | 3 inches (7.6 cm) | 250 pounds (110 kg) |
| 1976–1987 | Junior (wood kit) | 80 inches (200 cm) | 40 inches (100 cm) | 14 inches (36 cm) | 65 inches (170 cm) | 3 inches (7.6 cm) | (Note: 220 pounds (100 kg) with steel wheels, 206 pounds (93 kg) with plastic Z-Glas wheels) |
| 1988–1994 | Kit Car (fiber glass shell) | 80 inches (200 cm) | 40 inches (100 cm) | 14 inches (36 cm) | 65 inches (170 cm) | 3 5/8 inches (92 mm) | (Note: 220 pounds (100 kg) with steel wheels, 206 pounds (93 kg) with plastic Z-Glas wheels) |
| 1992–2001 | Stock (fiber glass shell) | 75 1/16 inches (1,907 mm) | 40 inches (100 cm) | 15 5/8 inches (400 mm) | 75 1/16 inches (1,907 mm) | 3 1/16 inches (78 mm) | 200 pounds (91 kg) |
| 1995–2001 | Super Stock (fiber glass shell) | 75 1/16 inches (1,907 mm) | 40 inches (100 cm) | 17 1/16 inches (433 mm) | 75 1/16 inches (1,907 mm) | 3 1/16 inches (78 mm) | 230 pounds (100 kg) |
| 1999–2001 | Masters (fiber glass shell) | 84 1/16 inches (2,135 mm) | 40 inches (100 cm) | 17 1/16 inches (433 mm) | 65 inches (170 cm) | 3 1/16 inches (78 mm) | 255 pounds (116 kg) |

== Modern Derby ==
Derby Downs in 2016, showing the finish-line bridge. Constructed in 2000, it replaced the older steel bridge built in 1938

The establishment of the pre-fabricated kit cars in 2000 as standard issue ushered in the modern era for the Soap Box Derby. Derby Downs also received a face lift in 2000 with the construction of its new $250,000 finish-line bridge (pictured). The original steel bridge, constructed in 1938, was used for 61 years. Since then the kit cars have remained visually the same, with the exception of minor upgrades to hardware that governs the safe control of the vehicle, and the introduction of the new UniGrip one-piece wheel in 2023. Cars participating in Legacy Division races are the only one-of-a-kind entries, each one being scratch-built, with the wheels being the only shared component with kit racers.

=== Race Week ===
Taking place the third week in July, Race Week comprises a full six days of social pre-race and competitive race events that culminate in the All-American World Championship on the Saturday. A traditional Derby practice on the Thursday evening is the Topside Show, an open house where participating cars are put on display for the general public to visit and view, located Topside. Competitive events that comprise Race Week include the following:

- AAA Local Challenge, sponsored by the American Automobile Association
- Akron Local, which declares the champion from Akron to be sent to the All-American
- AUI Rally Challenge, sponsored by Associated Underwriters Insurance
- Rally World Championship, which pits Regional Champions from the US and abroad for the world title
- All-Star Race
- Legacy Division, an unrestricted event for older racers
- National Super Kids Classic, for participating racers with physical challenges, inaugurated in 1975
- All-American World Championship on the Saturday, ending the week.

Participating cities around the world use advanced timing systems that measure the time difference between the competing cars to the thousandth of a second to determine the winner of a heat. Each heat of a race lasts less than 30 seconds. Most races are double elimination races in which a racer that loses a heat can work their way through the Challenger's Bracket in an attempt to win the overall race. The annual World Championship race in Akron, however, is a single elimination race which uses overhead photography, triggered by a timing system, to determine the winner of each heat. Approximately 500 racers compete in two or three heats to determine a World Champion in each divisions.

There are three racing divisions in most locals and at the All-American competition. The Stock division is designed to give the first-time builder a learning experience. Boys and girls, ages 7 through 13, compete in simplified cars built from kits purchased from the All-American. These kits assist the Derby novice by providing a step-by-step layout for construction of a basic lean forward style car. The Super Stock Car division, ages 9 through 18, gives the competitor an opportunity to expand their knowledge and build a more advanced model. Both of these beginner levels make use of kits and shells available from the All-American. These entry levels of racing are popular in race communities across the country, as youngsters are exposed to the Derby program for the first time. The Masters division offers boys and girls, ages 10 through 20, an advanced class of racer in which to try their creativity and design skills. Masters entrants may purchase a Scottie Masters Kit with a fiberglass body from the All-American Soap Box Derby.

=== Ultimate Speed Challenge ===
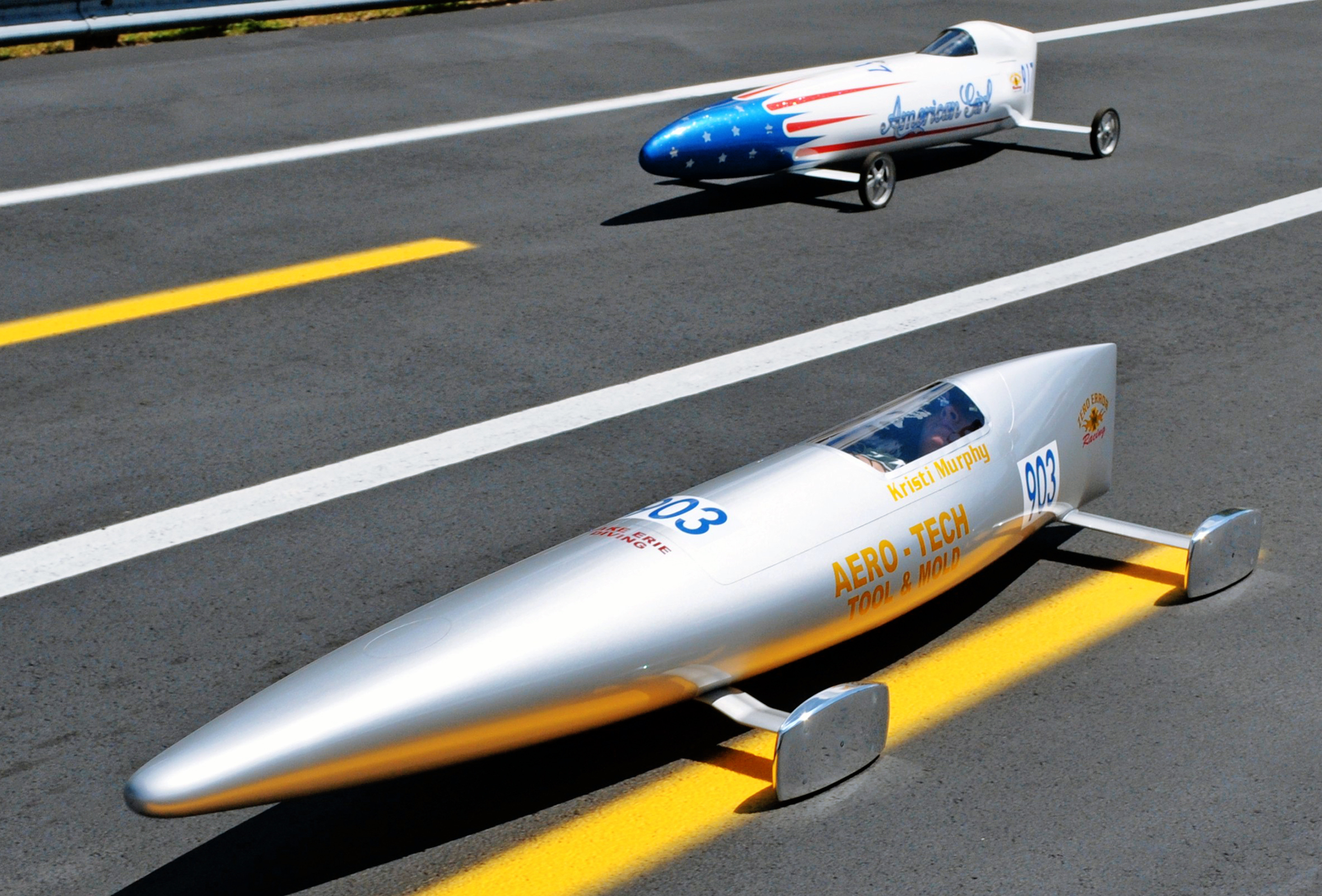
Ultimate Speed Challenge racers

The Ultimate Speed Challenge was a sanctioned racing format that ran from 2004 until 2014 as a way to preserve the tradition of innovation, creativity, and craftsmanship in the design of a gravity powered racing vehicle while generating intrigue, excitement, and engaging the audience at the annual All-American Soap Box Derby competition. The goal of the event was to attract creative entries designed to reach speeds never before attainable at Derby Downs. The competition consisted of three timed runs (one run in each lane), down the 989-foot (301 m) track. The car and team that achieved the fastest single run was declared the winner. The timed runs were completed during the All American Soap Box Derby race week.

The open rules of the Ultimate speed Challenge led to a variety of interesting car designs. Winning times improved as wheel technology advanced and the integration between the cars and wheels improved via the use of wheel fairings. Wheels played a key role in a car's success. Wheel optimization included a trend towards a smaller diameter (to reduce inertial effects and aerodynamic drag), the use of custom rubber or urethane tires (to reduce rolling resistance), and the use of solvents to swell the tires (also reducing rolling resistance). There was some overlap in technology between this race and other gravity racing events, including the buggy races race at Carnegie Mellon University.

==== Race highlights ====
===== 2004 =====
At the inaugural Ultimate Speed Challenge, the fastest time was achieved by a car designed and built by the Pearson family, driven by Alicia Kimball, and using high performance pneumatic tires. The winning time achieved on the 989-foot (301 m) track was 27.190 seconds.

===== 2005 =====
Jerry Pearson returned to defend the title with driver Nicki Henry in the 2005 Ultimate Speed Challenge beating the 2004 record time and breaking the 27.00-second barrier with an elapsed time of 26.953 seconds. Second place went to the DC Derbaticians with a time of 27.085 while third went to Talon Racing of Florida with a time of 27.320.

===== 2006 =====
John Wargo, from California, put together the 2006 Ultimate Speed Challenge winning team with driver Jenny Rodway. Jenny set a new track record of 26.934 seconds. Jenny's record stood for 3 years as revisions to the track and ramps after the 2006 race caused winning times to rise in subsequent races. Team Pearson finished 2nd with a time of 26.999 seconds and team Thomas finished 3rd with a time of 27.065.

===== 2007 =====
Team Eliminator, composed of crew chief and designer Jack Barr and driver Lynnel McClellan, achieved victory with a time of 27.160 in the 70th (2007) All-American Soap Box Derby Ultimate Speed Challenge. Jenn Rodway finished 2nd with a time of 27.334 while Hilary Pearson finished 3rd with a time of 27.367.

===== 2008 =====
Jack Barr returned in 2008 with driver Krista Osborne for a repeat team win with a 27.009-second run. Crew chief Tom Schurr and driver Cory Schurr place second with a time of 27.023 while crew chief Mike Albertoni and driver Danielle Hughes were 3rd after posting a time of 27.072.

===== 2009 =====
In the 72nd (2009) AASBD Ultimate Speed Challenge, Derek Fitzgerald's Zero-Error Racing team, with driver Jamie Berndt, took advantage of a freshly paved track, and set a new record time of 26.924 seconds. Cory Schurr placed second with a time of 26.987. Laura Overmyer of clean sheet racing finished third with a time of 27.003.

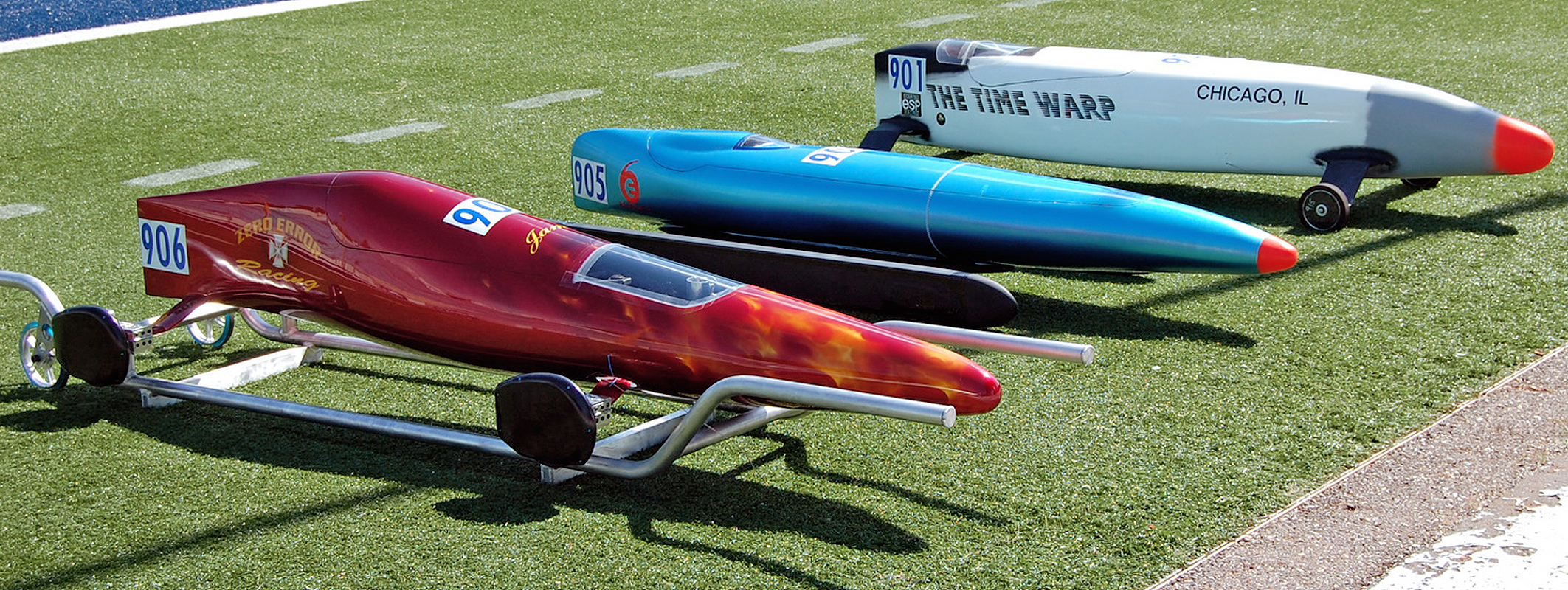
The top three finishers in 2010

===== 2010 =====
In 2010, Mark Overmyer's Clean Sheet/Sigma Nu team (CSSN) and driver Jim Overmyer set the track record at 26.861 seconds in the first heat of the opening round. Several minutes later, driver Sheri Lazowski, also of CSSN, lowered the record to 26.844 seconds, resulting in victory by 0.005 seconds over 2nd-place finisher Jamie Berndt of Zero Error. Competition was tight in 2010, with the top 3 cars finishing within a span of 0.017 seconds.

===== 2011 =====
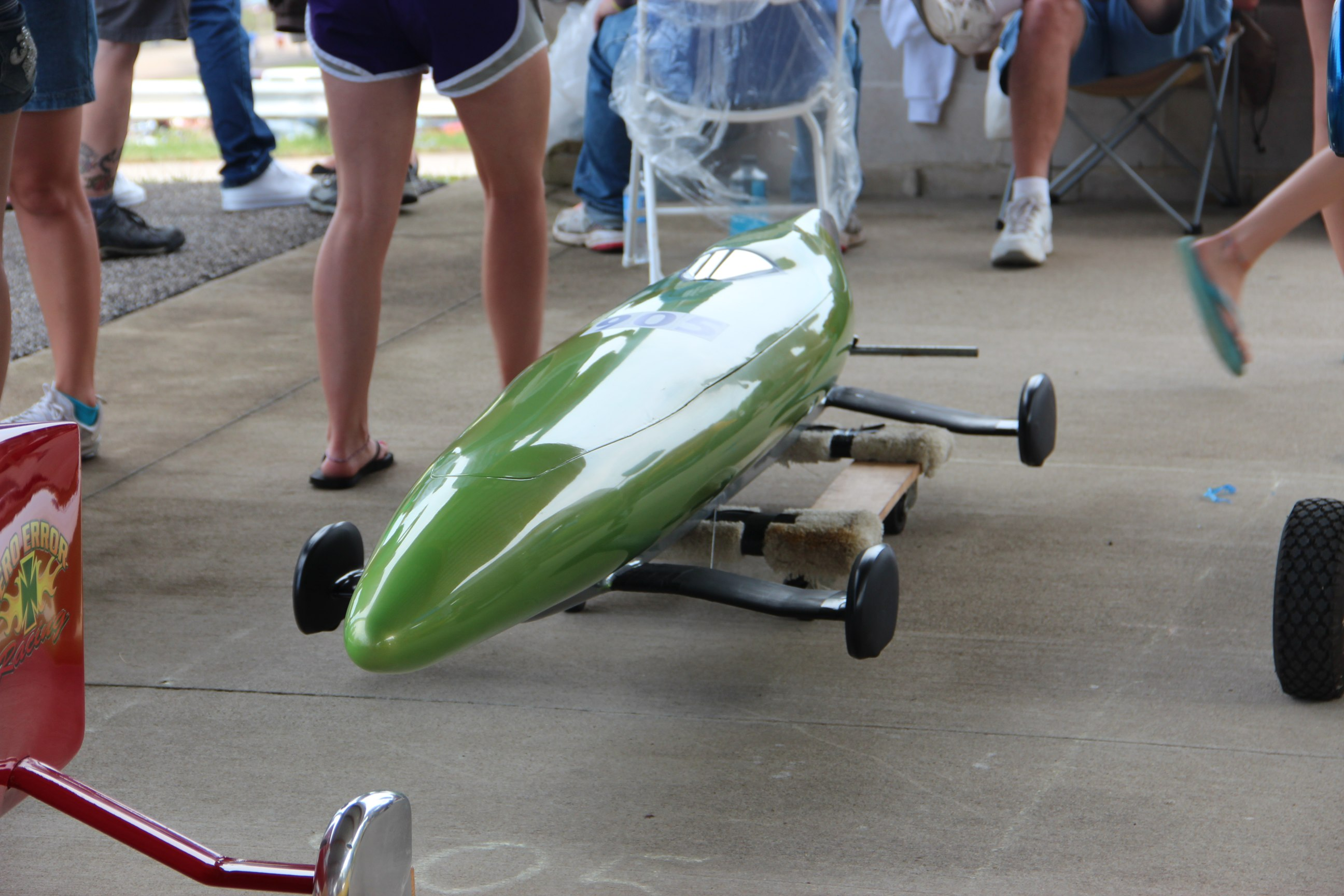
2010–11 Champ Sheri Lazowski

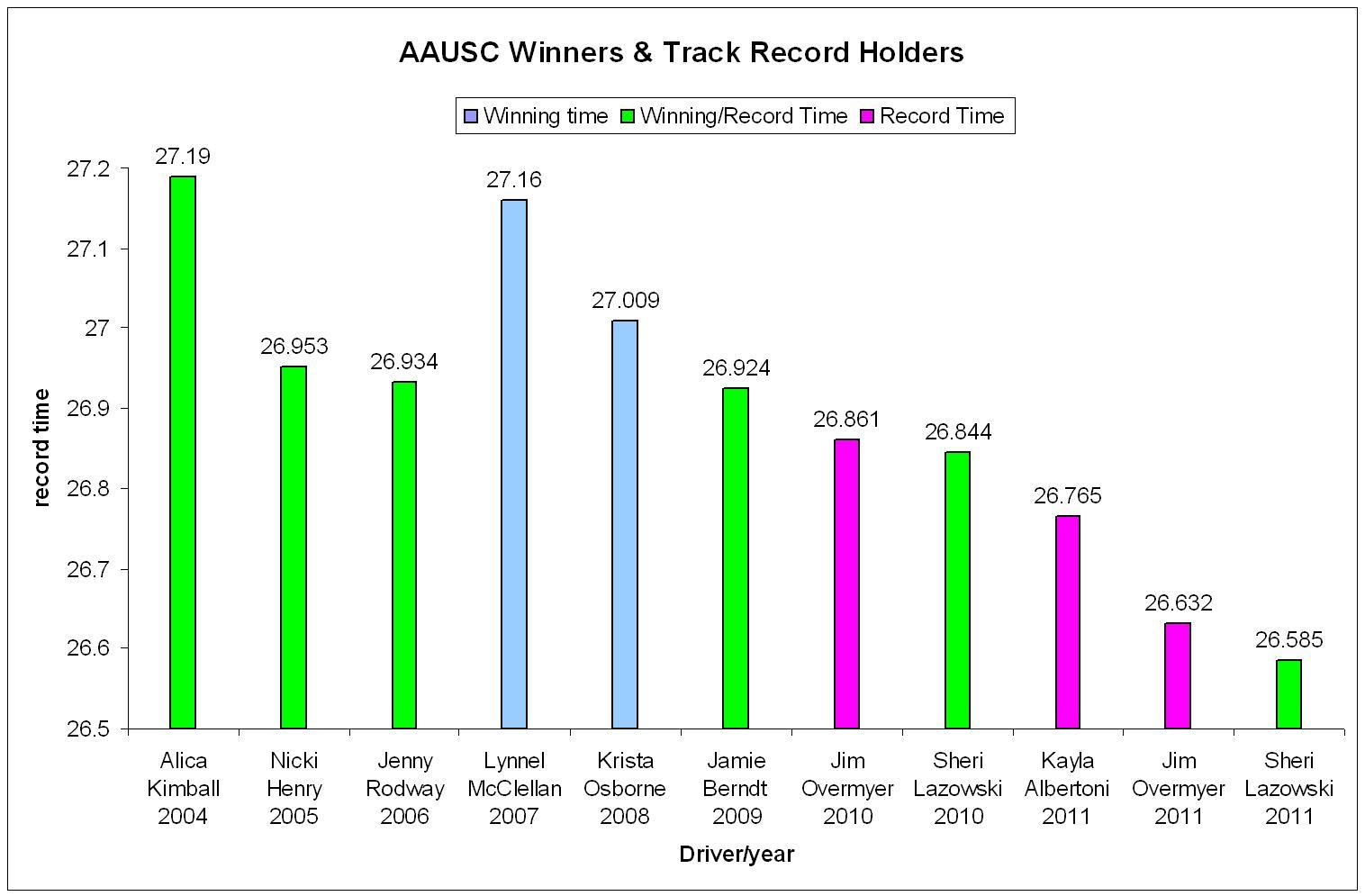
Winners and record holders

In 2011, advancements in wheel technology and car design, coupled with ideal track conditions, lead to significantly lower times in the Ultimate Speed Challenge. Driver Kayla Albertoni and crew chief Mike Albertoni broke the record in heat 2 or the opening round with a 26.765, taking 0.079 seconds off the 2010 record. One heat later, driver Jim Overmyer and crew chief Mark Estes of team CSSN racing lowered the record a further 0.133 with a 26.632 run. Jim improved to 26.613 in round 2 to secure 2nd place. In heat 5, of the opening round, driver Kristi Murphy and crew chief Pat Murphy secured 3rd place with a run of 26.677. In the next heat, driver Sheri Lazowski (her car pictured right) and crew chief Mark Overmyer (of CSSN racing) took the victory with a blistering run of 26.585 seconds. Sheri's record time was 0.259 seconds under her 2010 record and 0.339 seconds below the 2009 record. Her improvement in 2011 is the largest year-to-year change in the record in the history of the AAUSC race. By winning in both 2010 and 2011, Sheri became the first repeat USC winner.

===== 2012 =====
In 2012, revised starting ramps and a re-sealed track with a softer road surface, led to significant increases in finishing times. The 2012 winner, Laura Overmyer of CSSN racing, with crew chief Mark Estes, posted a winning time of 26.655 seconds, 0.070 seconds slower than the track record set by her team the prior year. Kristi Murphy, of Zero Error racing, finished in 2nd with a time of 26.769, 0.114 seconds back. Jamie Berndt, also of Zero Error racing, finished in 3rd place with a time of 26.827. Competition was not as close as in recent years, with the top 3 cars covering a span of 0.172 seconds. This is roughly double the span in 2009 and 2011 and 10 times the span in 2010. The 2012 results mark the 3rd consecutive win by CSSN racing and the 4th consecutive win by wheel expert Duane Delaney.

===== 2013 =====
The 2013 race was run under wet conditions which necessitated a format change. Each car was given a single run from lane 2 to determine the winner. The running order was randomly determined. CSSN Racing's Anne Taylor with crew chief Jerry Pearson won with a time of 26.978. Jillian Brinberg and crew chief Mark Estes, also of CSSN Racing, finished 2nd with a time of 26.992. Catherine Carney with crew chief Lee Carney finished 3rd with a time of 27.162.

===== 2014 =====
In 2014, CSSN's Anne Taylor with crew chief Jerry Pearson won with a time of 26.613. Anne's time improves on the prior best time for the new gate configuration but falls short of the 2011 record. This marks Anne's 2nd consecutive win and the 5th consecutive win for CSSN racing in this event. CSSN's Tucker McClaran with crew chief Mark Estes finished second with a time of 26.667. Catherine Carney with crew chief Lee Carney finished 3rd with a time of 26.750.

=== Legacy Division ===
Legacy was introduced in 2019 as a division for older kids and young adults, ages 12 to 20, piloting cars made from scratch instead of the official kits. The intention of Legacy is to appeal to an older demography of participants wishing to carry on the time-honored practice of hand-built racers like the stick cars from the seventies, eighties and nineties. 2024 will mark the fifth running of the Legacy Division Championship. Below are past World Champions.

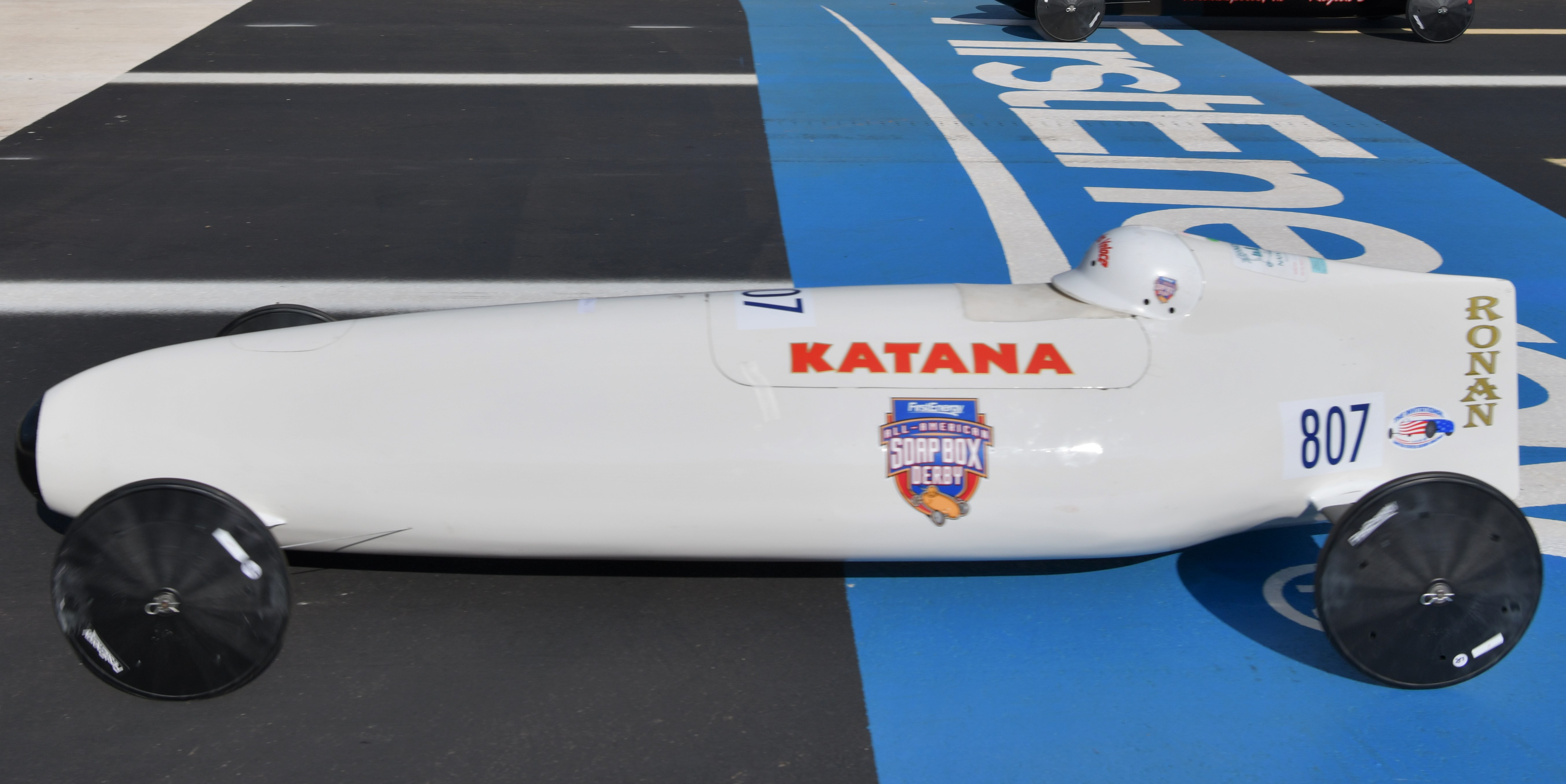
2nd Legacy World Champion Ronan Johnson of Camano Island, Washington, at the finish in 2021

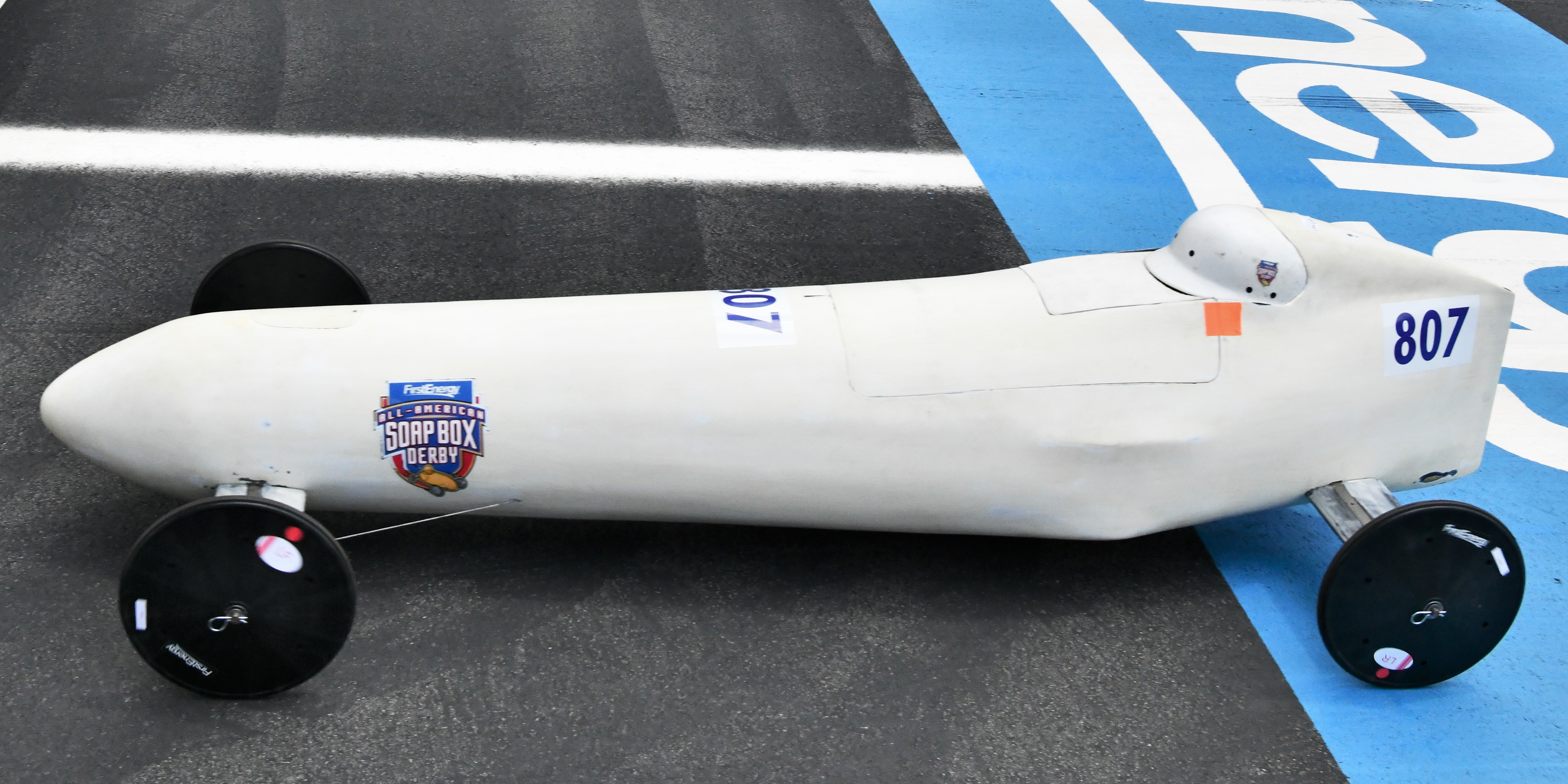
3rd Legacy World Champion Charlie Nigon of Altoona, Iowa, in 2022, who was runner-up the year prior

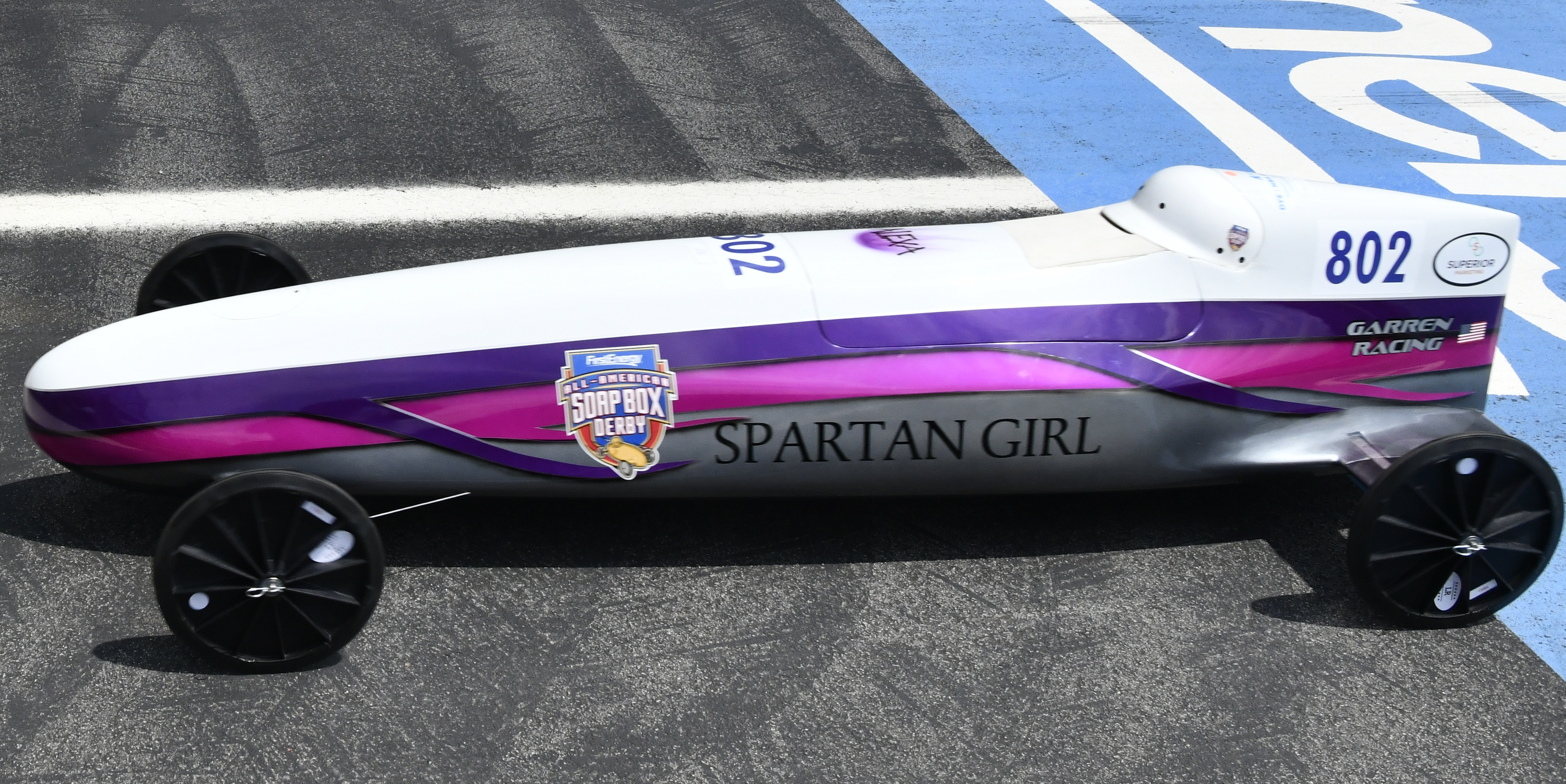
4th Legacy World Champion Alexa Garren, her car fitted with UniGrip wheels which debuted in 2023, was runner-up in 2022

== Soap Box Derby heritage ==
=== Soap Box Derby Hall of Fame ===
To honor individuals that have made a lasting and profound effect on the Soap Box Derby through significant contributions or dedication to the program, the Soap Box Derby Hall of Fame was instituted in 1997. Derby general manager Jeff Iula pushed for it about ten years before seeing it come to fruition. Inaugural inductees included Derby founder Myron E. Scott—who at the invitation of Iula attended the ceremony, Bain E. "Shorty" Fulton, Jim Schlemmer, Jimmy Stewart and Wilbur Shaw. Since then the Hall of Fame has inducted eighty more, including Ronald Reagan in 1951 when he was a Hollywood leading man, and Ken Cline, the only Soap Box Derby World Champion (1967) to be so honored.

The Soap Box Derby website states "Hall of Fame nominations are accepted each spring. To be considered for the Hall of Fame, candidates must have a minimum of 20 years' volunteer service at the local or national level or have made a significant financial or sponsorship contribution to the program. Former racers of at least 10 years ago or Derby staff members with a minimum of 10 years' service also can be nominated."

==== The Museum ====
The physical component of the Hall of Fame is the Museum itself, dedicated to showcasing Championship racers that won in Akron since the program began. Each year every All-American Champion must pass ownership of their car to the AASBD, which exhibits it in the Museum. During the summer months when racing is in full swing, the Museum is open to the public.

As early as 1979 the idea of an official museum to house these cars was discussed by then general manager Wayne Alley. In a 1985 interview, Jeff Iula stated "The old cars were lying in the barn at Derby Downs, and they were banged up." With that, Derby track manager Ray Sandy undertook their restoration. In 1981 Derby Downs created the Soap Box Derby Hall of Fame at the Akron Convention & Visitors Bureau in Cascade Plaza, which featured 31 of the 48 extant champ cars as well as historical documents. In 1997 plans were drawn to seek funding for upgrades and an overhaul of the track, with part of it earmarked for construction of a building located behind the grand stand intended to house a museum. This was never built. In 2012 the current museum was created by the FirstEnergy Soap Box Derby, housed in the large outbuilding at the top of the hill (called Topside) at Derby Downs. It houses about half of the 140+ vehicles that have crossed the All-American finishing line as winners over the years, displayed on the floor, or hung vertically or upside down from a steel-framed upper deck at the far end from the main entrance. They include 1947 Soap Box Derby World Champion Kenneth Holmboe (pictured below), and replicas of Robert Gravett's 1933 racer and Jim Gronen's magnet car from 1973. Along with the cars are plaques and memorabilia. Each summer during Race Week the building serves as the staging facility for all cars entered in ancillary races leading up to and including the All-American. Closed from October to April it doubles as a winter storage facility serving the general public.

==== List of Hall of Fame Museum cars on exhibit ====
Listed by date, these cars all won All-American National and World Championships.

- Robert Gravett, (Note: Replica of Official logo car, which predates the All-American) Dayton, Ohio, 1933
- Robert Turner, Muncie, Indiana, 1934
- Maurice Bale Jr., Anderson, Indiana, 1935
- Herbert Muench, St. Louis, Missouri, 1936
- Thomas Fisher, Detroit, Michigan, 1940
- Kenneth Holmboe, Charleston, West Virginia, 1947 (pictured below)
- Fred Derks, Akron, Ohio, 1949
- Harold Williamson, Charleston, West Virginia, 1950
- Joe Lunn, Columbus, Georgia, 1952 (pictured below)
- Freddy Mohler Muncie, Indiana, 1953
- Richard Rohrer, Rochester, New York, 1955
- Norman Westfall, Rochester, New York, 1956
- James Miley, Muncie, Indiana, 1958
- Bob Carter, (Note: Did not race at the All-American.) Colorado Springs, Colorado, 1961 (pictured below)
- Harold Conrad, Duluth, Minnesota, 1963 (pictured below)
- Gregory Schumacher, Tacoma, Washington, 1964
- Robert Logan, Santa Ana, California, 1965
- David Krussow, Tacoma, Washington, 1966
- Ken Cline, Lincoln, Nebraska, 1967 (pictured below)
- Branch Lew, Muncie, Indiana, 1968
- Steve Souter, Midland, Texas, 1969
- Sam Gupton, Durham, North Carolina, 1970
- Ray Cornwell, (Note: Did not race at the All-American.) Akron, Ohio, 1970
- Larry Blair, Oroville, California, 1971
- Brent Yarborough, Elk Grove, California, 1973
- Jim Gronen, (Note: Replica of disqualified All-American) Boulder, Colorado, 1973
- Curt Yarborough, Elk Grove, California, 1974
- Karren Stead, Morrisville, Pennsylvania, 1975 (pictured below)
- Phil Raber (Junior), New Philadelphia, Ohio, 1976
- Joan Ferdinand (Senior), Canton, Ohio, 1976
- Mark Ferdinand (Junior), Canton, Ohio, 1977
- Steve Washburn (Senior), Bristol, Connecticut, 1977
- Darren Hart (Junior), Salem, Oregon, 1978
- Greg Cardinal (Senior), Flint, Michigan, 1978
- Russ Yurk (Junior), Flint, Michigan, 1979
- Chris Fulton (Junior), Indianapolis, Indiana, 1980
- Howie Fraley (Junior), Portsmouth, Ohio, 1981
- Tonia Schlegel (Senior), Hamilton, Ohio, 1981
- Carol Ann Sullivan (Junior), Rochester, New Hampshire, 1982
- Matt Wolfgang (Senior), Pennsburg, Pennsylvania, 1982
- Tony Carlini (Junior), Orange County, California, 1983
- Mike Burdgick (Senior), Flint, Michigan, 1983 (pictured below)
- Anita Jackson (Senior), St. Louis, Missouri, 1984
- Matt Sheffer (Senior), York, Pennsylvania, 1985
- Marc Behan (Junior), New Hampshire State, 1986
- Matthew Margules (Junior), Danbury, Connecticut, 1987
- Brian Drinkwater (Senior), Bristol, Connecticut, 1987
- David Duffield (Masters), Kansas City, Missouri, 1988
- David Schiller II (Kit Car), Dayton, Ohio, 1989
- Faith Chavarria (Masters), Tri County, California, 1989
- Sami Jones (Masters), Salem, Oregon, 1990
- Paul Greenwald (Kit Car), Saginaw, Michigan, 1991
- Daniel Garland (Masters), San Diego, California, 1991
- Loren Hurst (Stock), Akron Suburban, Ohio, 1992
- Carolyn Fox (Kit Car), Salem, Oregon, 1992
- Bonnie Thornton (Masters), Las Vegas, Nevada, 1992
- Owen Yuda (Stock), Harrisburg, Pennsylvania, 1993
- Danielle DelFerraro (Kit Car), Akron Suburban, Ohio, 1993
- Dean Lutton (Masters), North Central, Ohio, 1993
- Kristina Damond (Stock), Jamestown, New York, 1994
- Danielle DelFerraro (Masters), Akron, Ohio, 1994
- Darcie Davisson (Super Stock), Kingman, Arizona, 1995
- Johnathon Fensterbush (Masters), Kingman, Arizona, 1995
- Matthew Perez (Stock), Akron Suburban, Ohio, 1996
- Jeremy Phillips (Super Stock), Charleston, West Virginia, 1996
- Mark Stephens (Stock), Waynesboro Suburban, Virginia, 1997
- Wade Wallace (Masters), Elkhart County, Indiana, 1997
- Dolline Vance Salem (Super Stock), Oregon, 1997
- Stacey Sharp (Super Stock), Kingman, Arizona, 1998
- James Marsh (Masters), Cleveland, Ohio, 1998
- Justin Pillow (Stock), Central Florida, 1999
- Alisha Ebner (Super Stock), Salem, Oregon, 1999
- Rachel Curran (Stock), Akron Suburban, Ohio, 2000
- Derek Etherington (Super Stock), Anderson, Indiana, 2000
- Cody Butler (Masters), Anderson, Indiana, 2000
- Michael Flynn (Masters), Detroit, Michigan, 2001
- Evan Griffin (Masters), Central Florida, 2002
- Nicholas Sibeto (Stock), New Castle, Pennsylvania, 2003
- Anthony Marulli (Masters), Rochester, New York, 2003
- RickiLea Murphy (Super Stock), Portage County, Ohio, 2004
- Hilary Pearson (Masters), Kansas City, Missouri, 2004
- Tyler Gallagher (Super Stock), Portage County, Ohio, 2005
- Sally Sue Thornton (Super Stock), Vallejo, California, 2006
- Tyler Shoff (Stock), Akron Metro, Ohio, 2007
- Andrew Feldpausch (Super Stock), Saginaw, Michigan, 2007
- Kacie Rader (Masters), Washington, D.C., 2007
- Hayley Beitel (Super Stock), Tullahoma, Tennessee, 2008
- Courtney Rayle (Masters), Washington, D.C., 2008
- Sarah Whitaker (Stock), Akron, Ohio, 2009
- Maija Liimatainen (Super Stock), Madison, Wisconsin, 2009
- Sheri Lazowski (Ultimate), 2010

==== Gallery of Hall of Fame Museum cars on exhibit ====
These illustrations or photographs depict some of the Derby cars listed above.

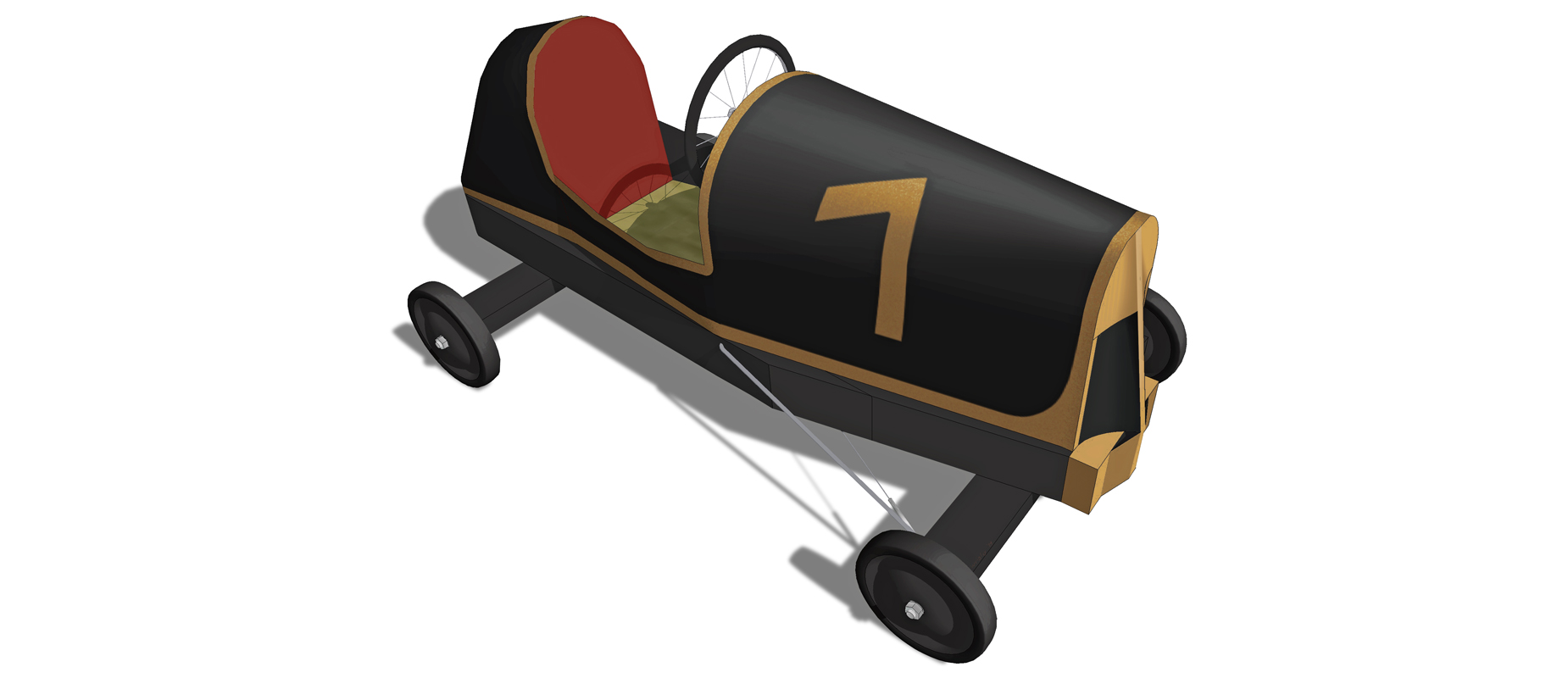
A render of 1933 inaugural soap box race runner-up Robert Gravett's car at Hall of Fame Museum

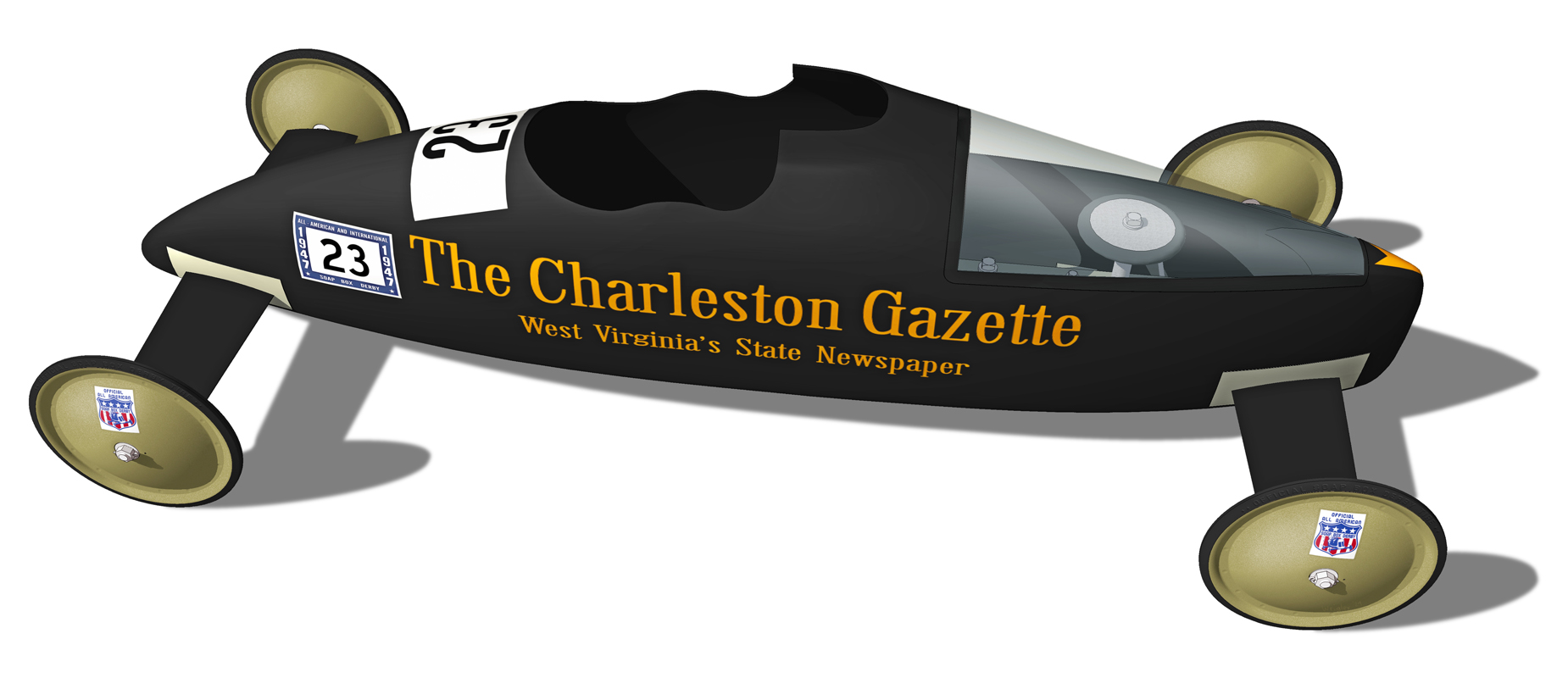
1947 World Champion Kenneth Holmboe's car is on exhibit at the Hall of Fame, hanging upside down

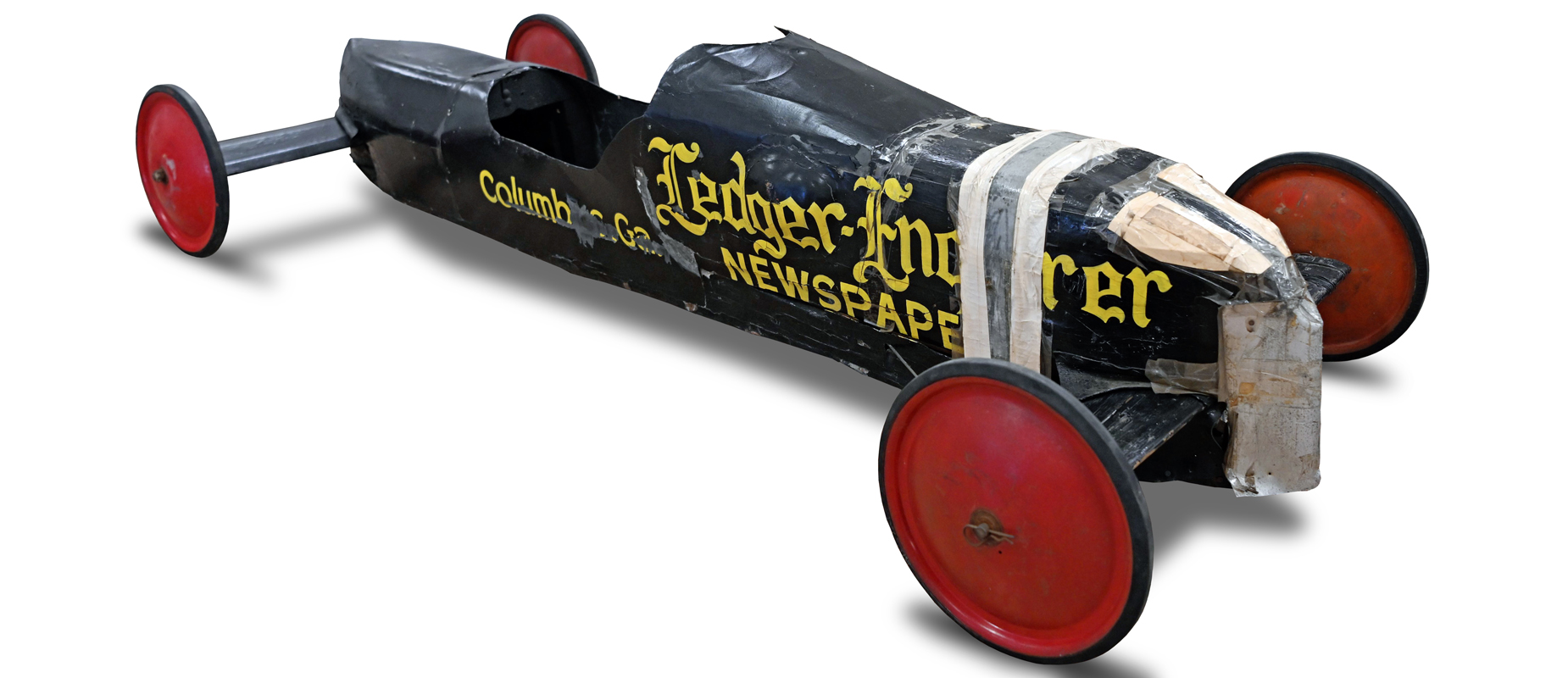
1952 World Champion Joe Lunn's car showing crash damage, exhibited on a display stage

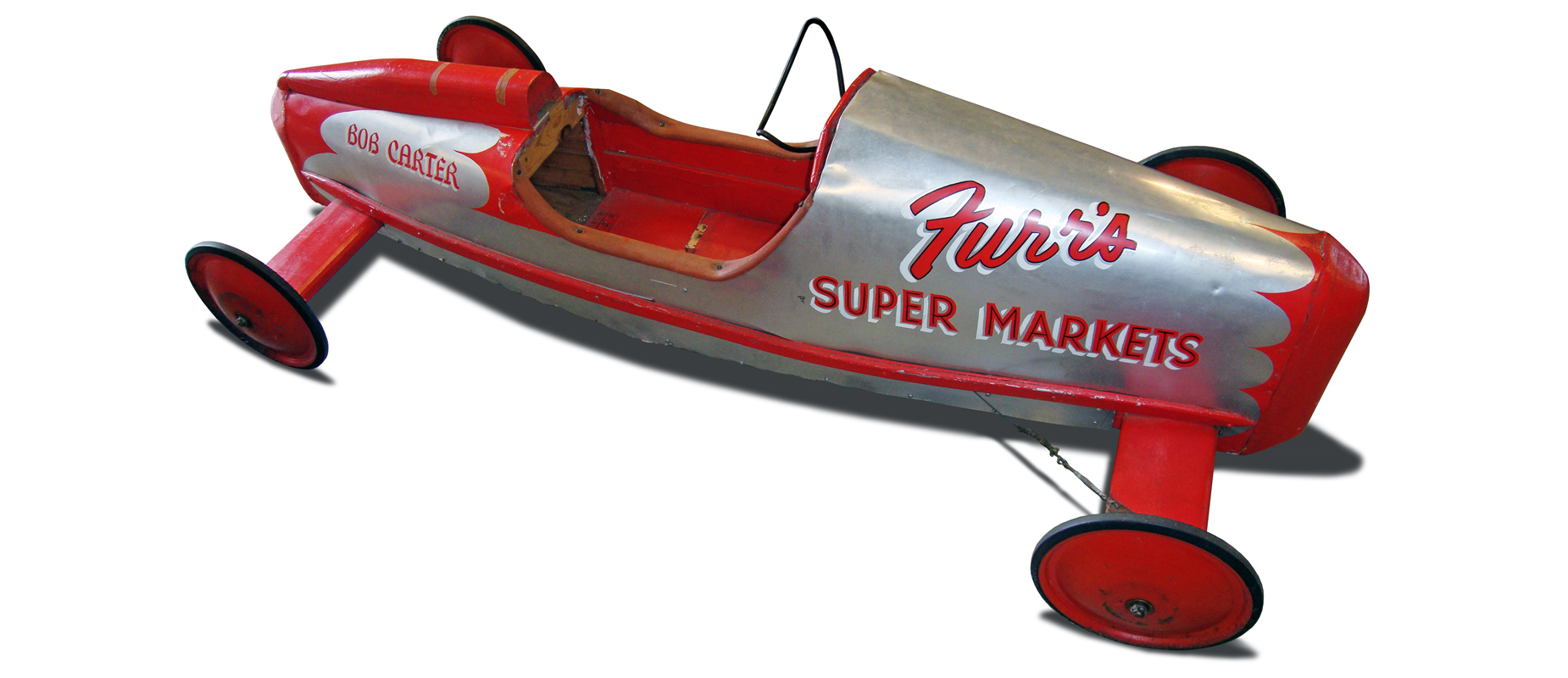
1961 Colorado Springs, Colorado racer Bob Carter, who did not compete at the All-American

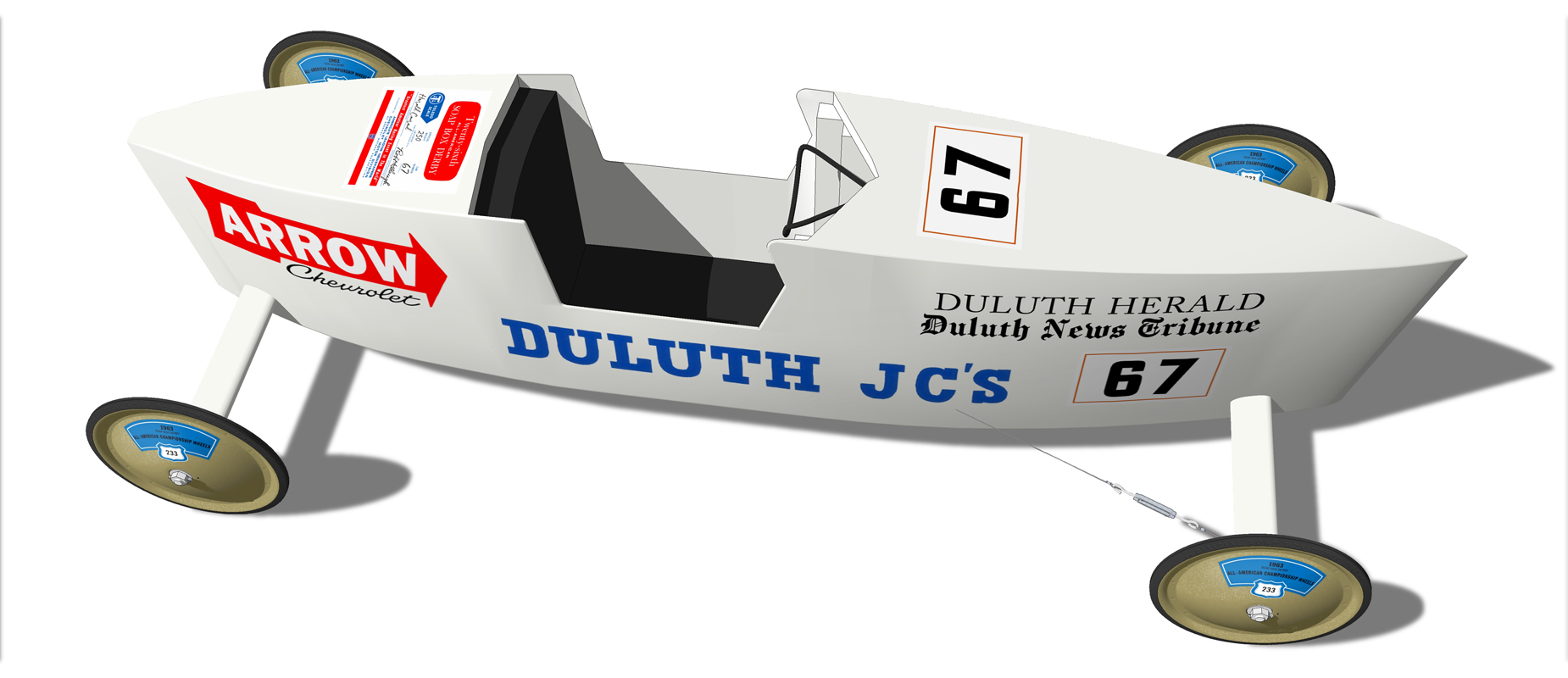
1963 World Champion Harold "Bo" Conrad's simply constructed, soap box-style car

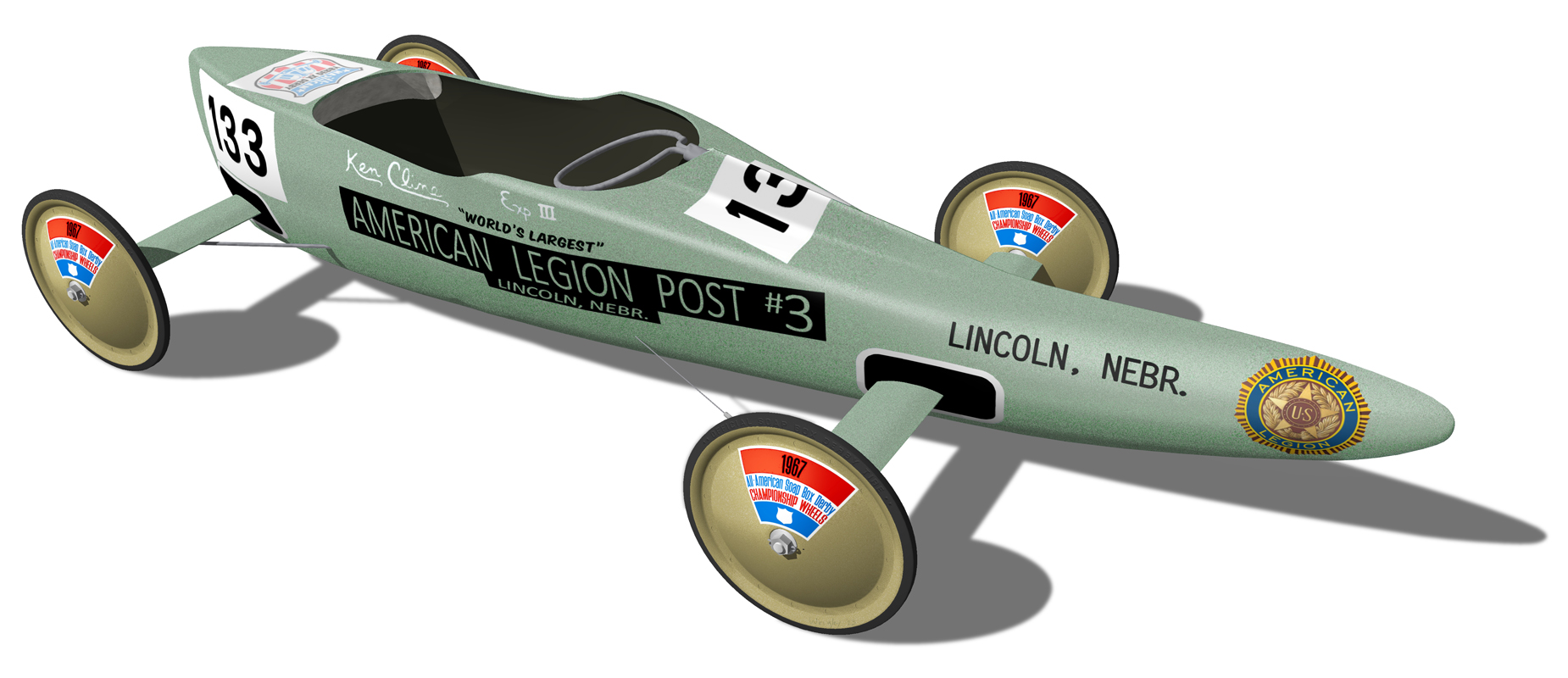
1967 World Champion Ken Cline's racer, dubbed "the Grasshopper", hung upside down

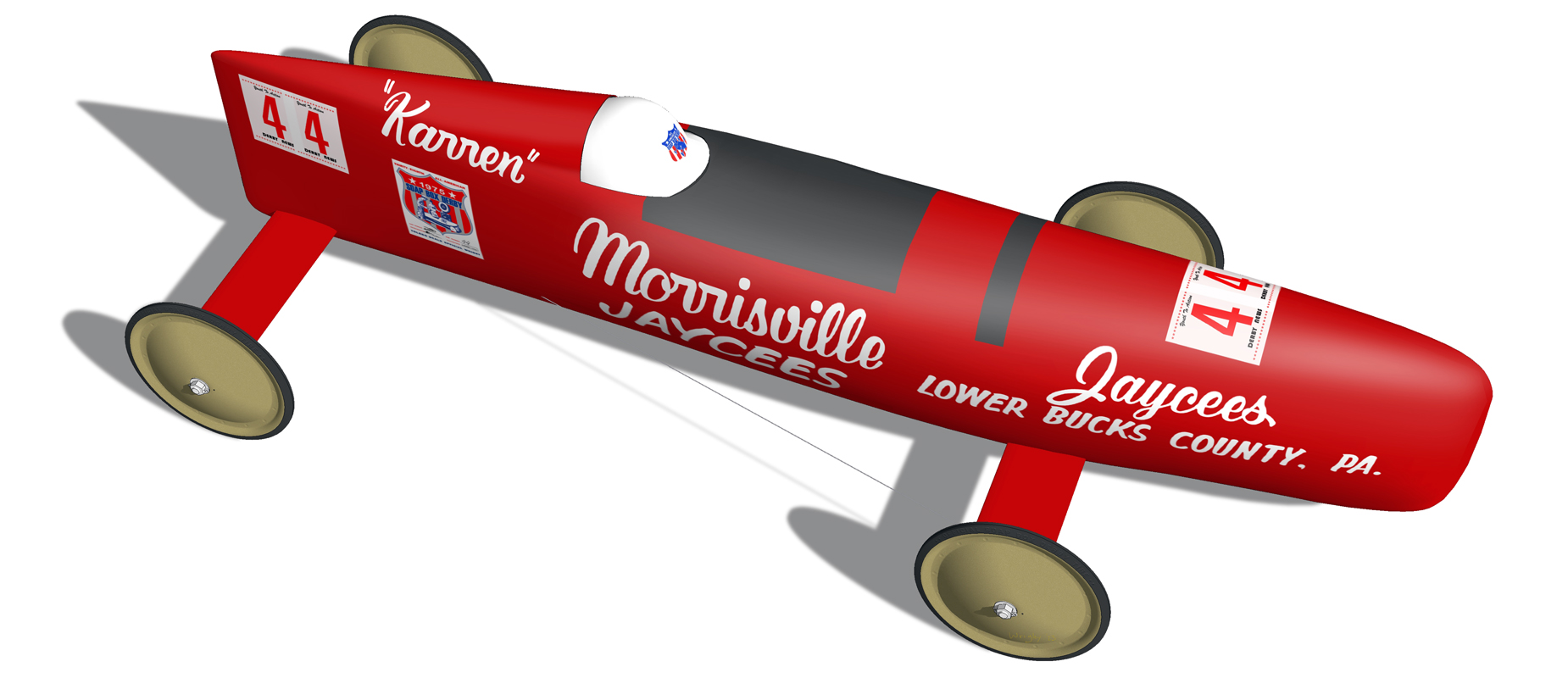
1975 World Champion Karren Stead's lay-down car, exhibited in a glass-enclosed showcase

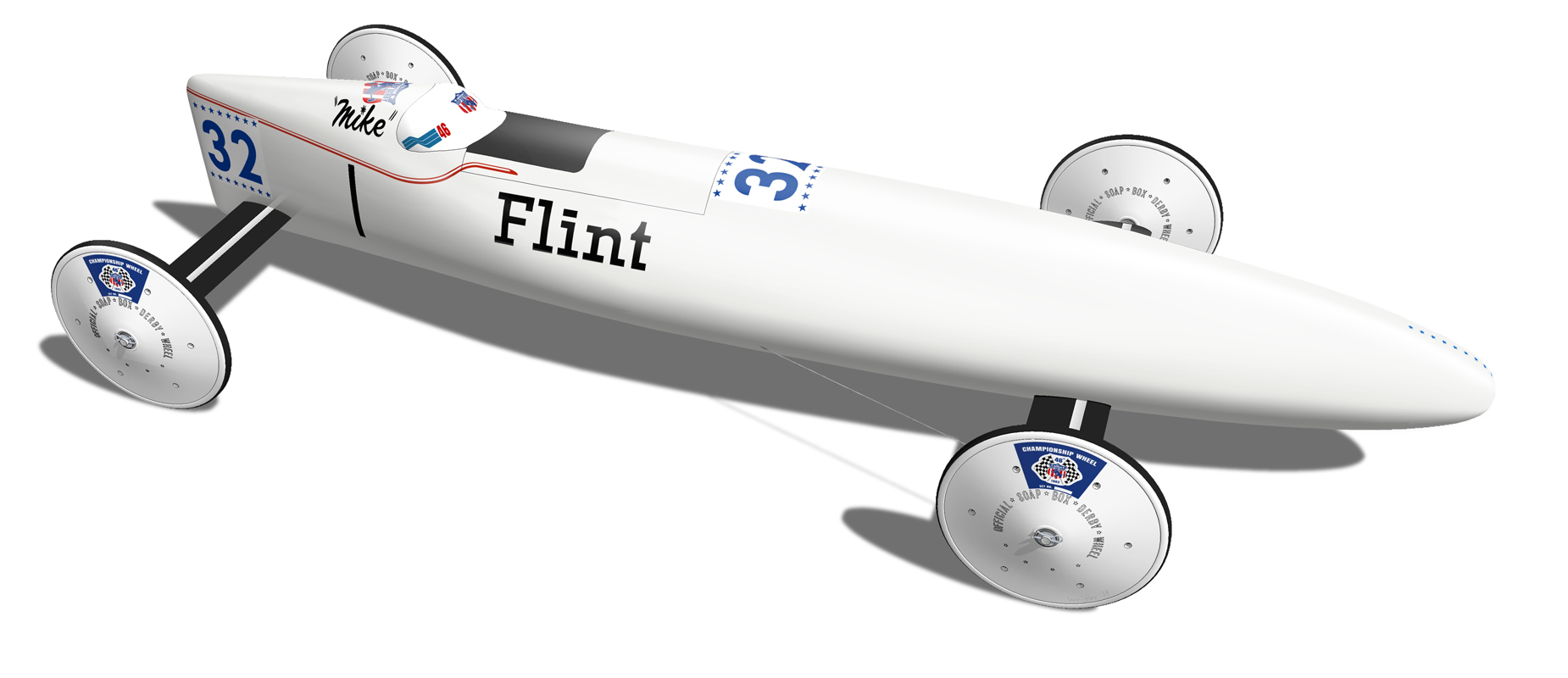
1982 NDR National Rally and 1983 Senior World Championship winner Mike Burdgick

=== Retired Derby cars ===
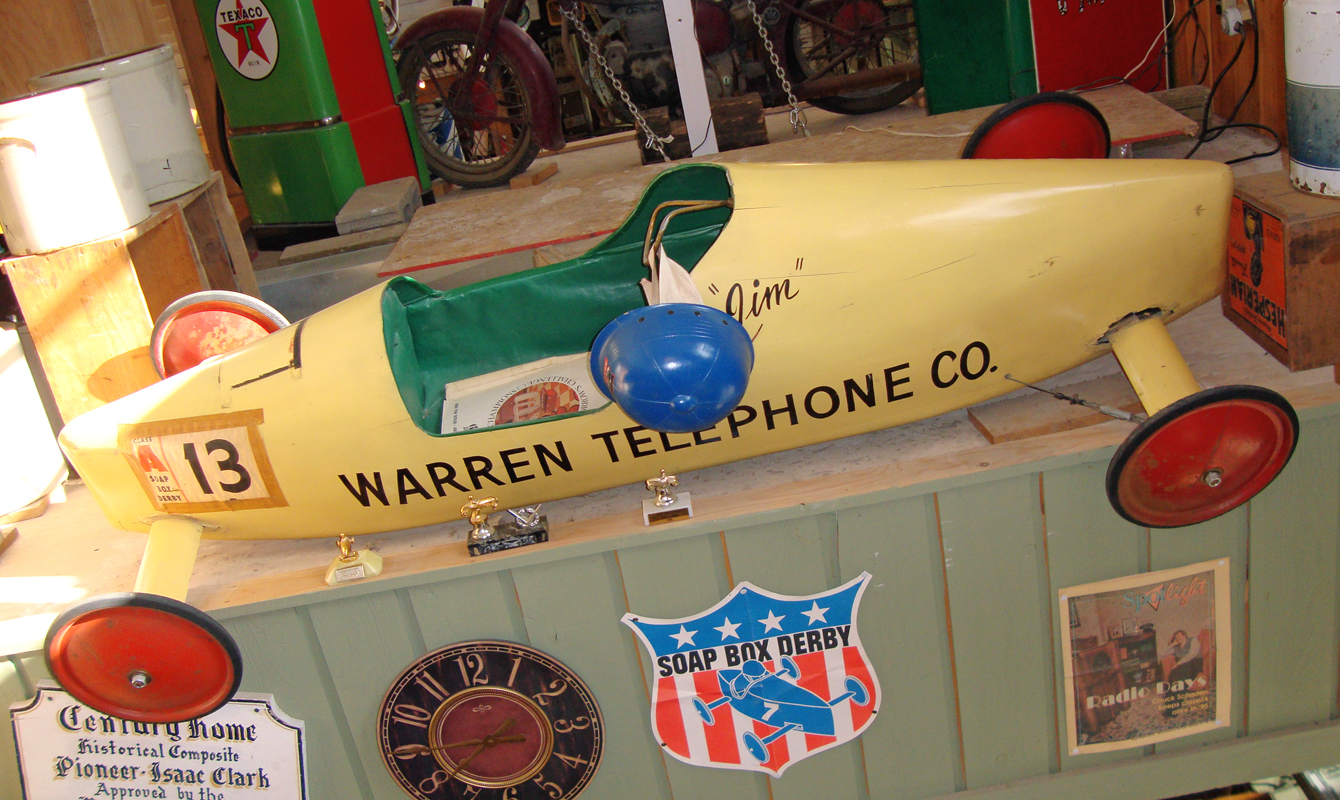
1961 Warren, Ohio class A racer James Chadwick's car on exhibit at the End of the Commons General Store in Mesopotamia, Ohio

Besides the Hall of Fame Museum cars, there are numerous extant Derby racers now retired to the attics, basements and garages of uncounted American households. 1946 Roanoke, Virginia Champion David Poage was interviewed on WFXR Fox News in August 2023 showing he still had his car after 77 years.

Some Derby survivors become repurposed as decor in public venues like bars and restaurants as prized examples of Americana. Good examples are the End of the Commons General Store in Mesopotamia, Ohio, which has among its many examples of Americana on display two cars placed high above the retail floor: one driven by 1960 Warren, Ohio Champion Allen Frantz, who donated his racer in 2015, and a second (pictured) from 1961 Warren, Ohio class A racer James Chadwick. Other locations include Stables Cafe, a restaurant located in Guthrie, Oklahoma, which has as part its extensive antiques collection an unidentified lay-down racer from the 1970s suspended above the dining area, and Logan's Bar and Grill in Freeport, Illinois, which has a racer piloted by Cathy Martin, a class A entry, suspended from the ceiling.

More visible than the racers themselves is the programs, buttons, flags, jerseys, banners, posters and Derby keepsakes and take-away items found frequently on eBay and various websites catering to collectors.

=== Ron Reed ===
==== Miniature Derby Models ====
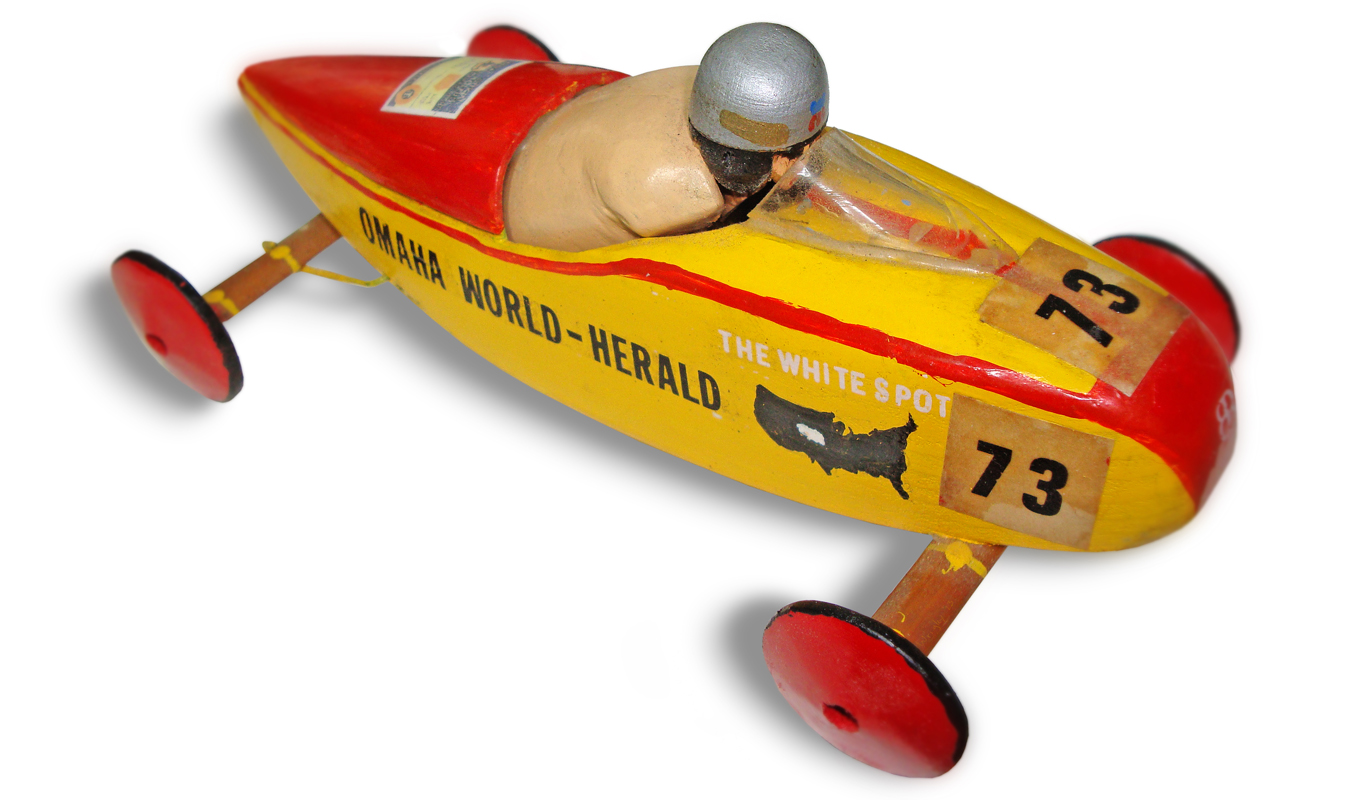
6 5/8-inch (170 mm)-long model by Ron Reed depicting 1938 Soap Box Derby World Champion Robert Berger in his car

One of the most active participants in preserving Derby heritage is All-American historian, author and model maker Ron Reed, creator of the Ron Reed Miniature Derby Models. The collection showcases detailed scale models of every All-American winning car and top eight runner's up since the beginning of the sport in 1934 through to 2007. In 1981 when Ron had already completed 143 cars, his collection was exhibited at the Soap Box Derby Hall of Fame at the Akron Convention & Visitors Bureau in Cascade Plaza. In 2009 it found a home at the AASBD head office building at Derby Downs, enshrined in a glass display case.

Each hand-carved model, which also includes the driver in a crouched position, measures 6 5/8 inches (170 mm) long, so they are not exactly in scale with each other, as the actual cars they are meant to duplicate vary in length. Ron uses bass wood as his carving material. He also does commission work for Derby racers wishing to have their car replicated, and has completed over 500 examples since he began. A resident of Mogadore, Ohio, just east of Akron, Ron attended his first All-American in 1949, and although he never actually raced as a boy—he admitted that he was not adept with tools nor had a place to build a car—he attended almost every All-American since then, missing only three. In that time he snapped over 60,000 photographs of almost every racer that made it to Akron. He does not work from measurements when he replicates a car, using the photographs as a reference point and carving each one by eye. Hand-painted to an exact color match of the original car, Reed admits that duplicating it along with the lettering can be difficult. If he did not have a photo of the car, he would access the Akron Beacon Journal's archives, or even fly to another city to find an image in their local newspaper's archives or public library.

==== Books penned by Reed ====
In 1983 Jeff Iula, Ron Reed and literary guide Tom Klinger stated that they had a book—"THE" Derby book covering the detailed history of the Soap Box Derby—ready for print, and were seeking a publisher. When nothing came of it, Reed went ahead and self-published four books of his own that covered the history of the sport from 1935 to 1959, beginning with Tallmadge Hill: The Story of the 1935 All-American Soap Box Derby in 2013. In 2015 on the 80th anniversary of the 1935 All-American, a commemorative exhibition race was held at the same location as the 1935 race, with one-hundred participants racing down Tallmadge Hill in makeshift Derby cars. Reed, who spoke the opening remarks at the event, helped organize the race with Tallmadge Mayor David Kline.

Books penned by Reed are: Tallmadge Hill: The Story of the 1935 All-American Soap Box Derby (2013), Derby Downs: The 1936 and 1937 All-American Soap Box Derbies (2014), The All-American Soap Box Derby: A Review of the Formative Years 1938 thru 1941 (2016), and A Look Back at the All-American Soap Box Derby 1946–1959 (2018). They open each chapter with an historical summary leading up to the race, the rule changes for that year, celebrities that appeared in the Oil Can Race, details of the most important heats and their participants—including photos, and additional trivia relating to the event.

In 2008 Reed was inducted into the Soap Box Derby Hall of Fame.

=== Vintage Derby Car Show ===
3rd Vintage Derby Car Show
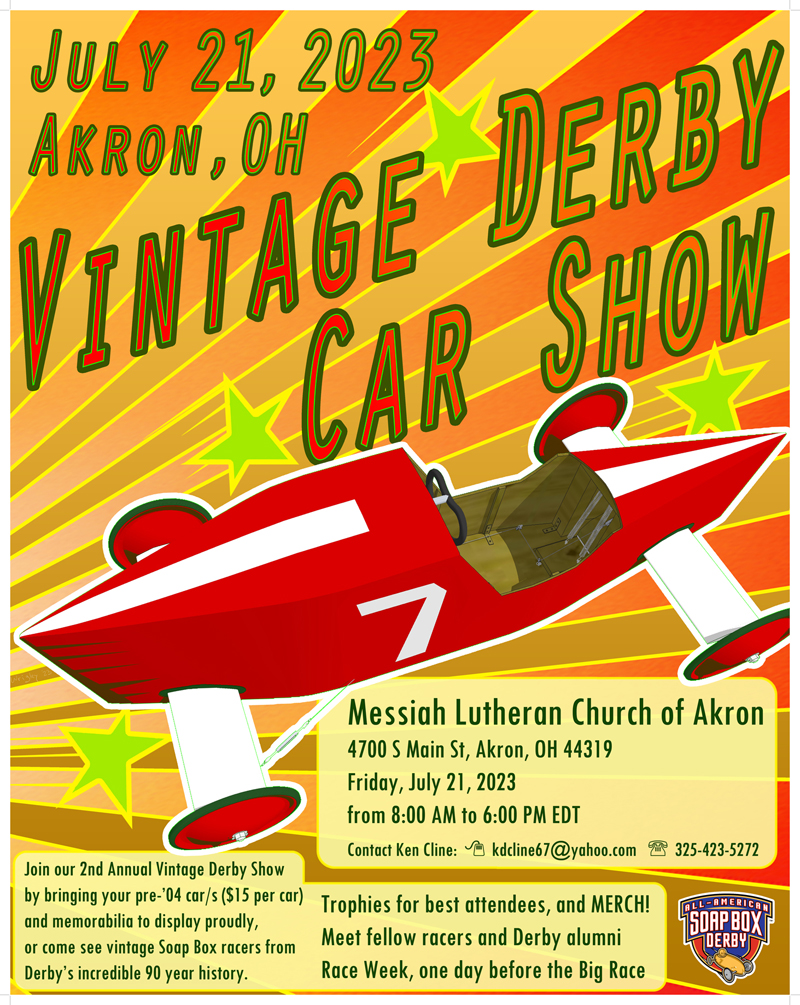
- Poster from 2023
- Date: July 19, 2024
- Time: 8:00–18:00 (Eastern Daylight)
- Duration: 10 hours
- Venue: United Steelworkers Local 2L Banquet Hall
- Location: 501 Kelly Ave # A, Akron, Ohio 44306; 41.05103674715359°N 81.48110253143899°W
- Type: Car and memorabilia show
- Theme: Vintage Soap Box Derby
- Organised by: Ken Cline, Keith Lamb, Ron Reed, Rick Acker
- Filmed by: Kevin Boyd
- Awards: Trophies for Best-in-Show

In 2022 the Inaugural Vintage Derby Car Show was held in Akron, Ohio, the first of its kind to showcase extant vintage racers. This was an open invitation to any and all Derby alumni that wished to attend with their old car or cars and keepsakes like trophies, pins and jerseys. Headed by 1967 All-American World Champion and 2017 AASBD Hall of Fame inductee Ken Cline, the one day event comprised twenty seven cars during Soap Box Derby Race Week, one day prior to the All-American World Championship. The oldest car in the exhibit (pictured below) was piloted by 1935 Indianapolis, Indiana Champion Earl Sullivan. The following year the 2nd Annual Vintage Derby Car Show displayed thirty-one cars in a larger venue, with ten trophies hand crafted by Cline awarded to the best presentations that day. The 3rd Vintage Derby Car Show took place on July 19, 2024, at the United Steelworkers Local 2L Banquet Hall in Akron, Ohio 2.5 miles (4.0 km) northwest of Derby Downs, and was open to Derby cars prior to 1999.

==== Images of 2022 show ====
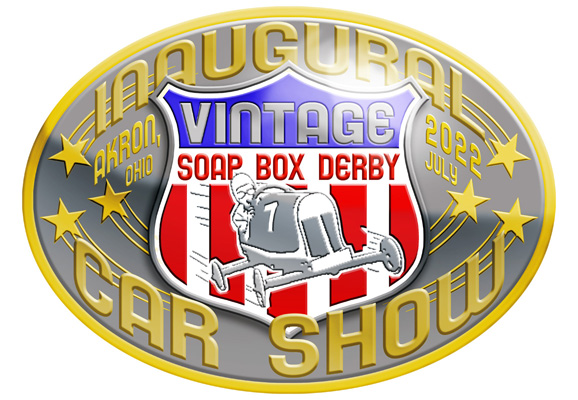
Inaugural Vintage Derby Car Show commemorative belt buckle design

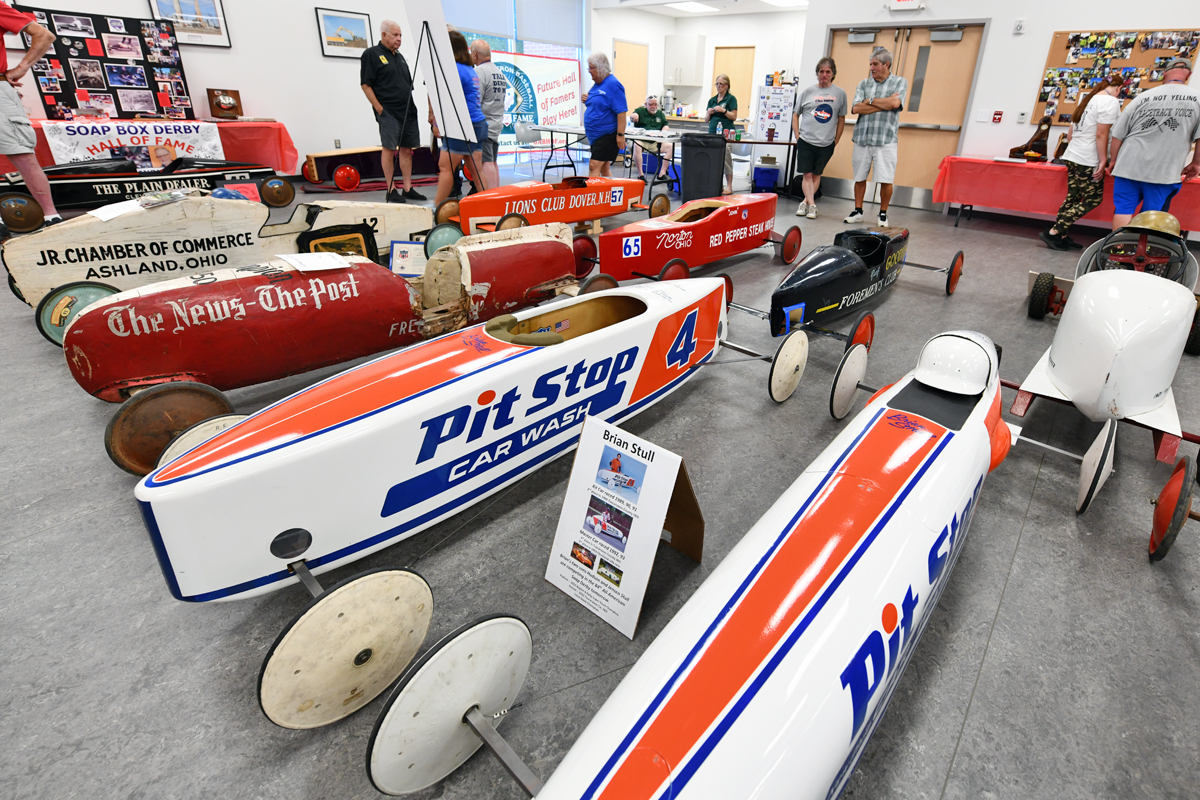
An array of classic designs at the 2022 Inaugural Vintage Derby Car Show in Akron, Ohio on July 22, 2022

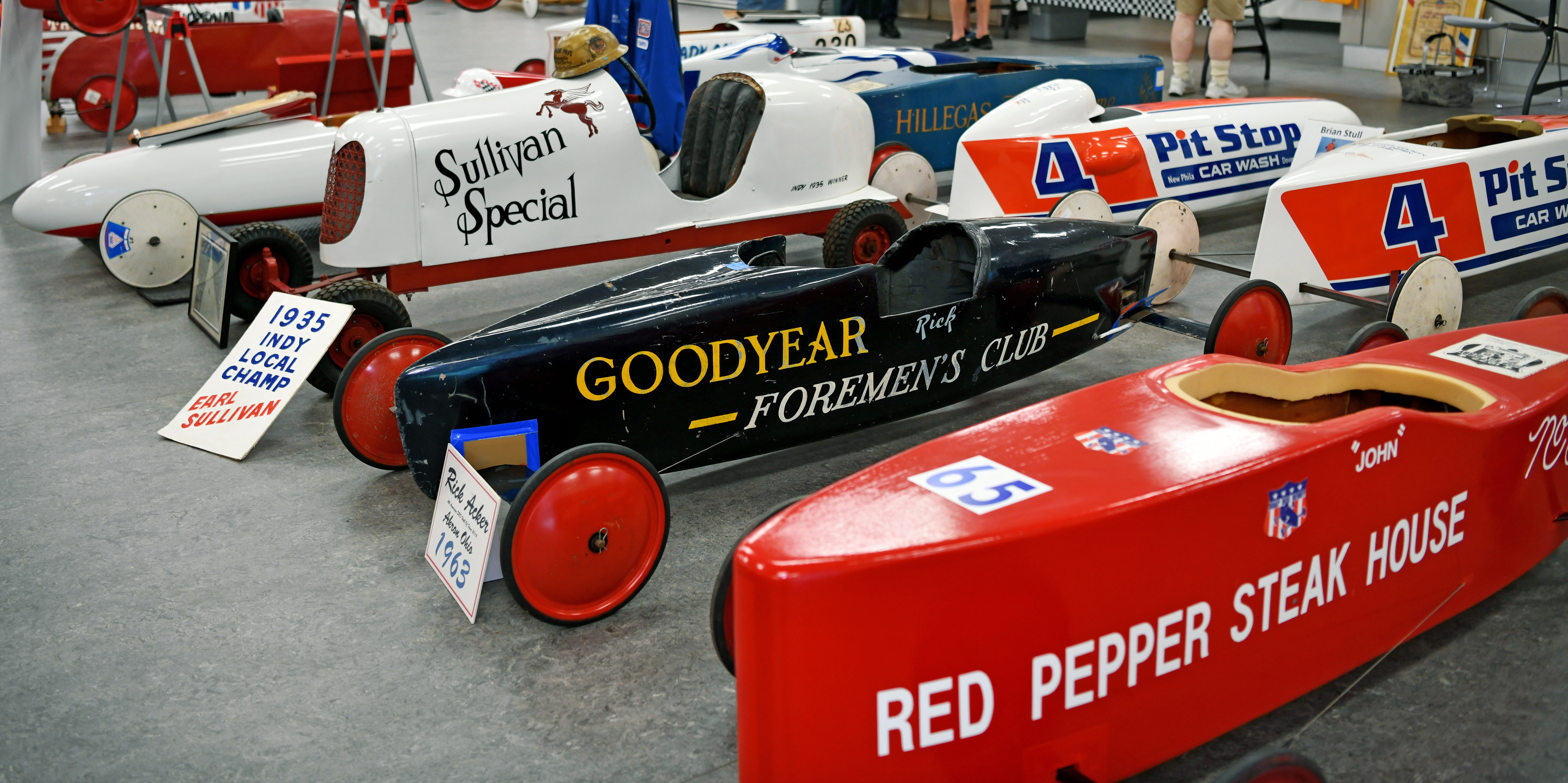
An array of classic designs at the 2022 Inaugural Vintage Derby Car Show in Akron, Ohio on July 22, 2022

==== Images of 2023 show ====
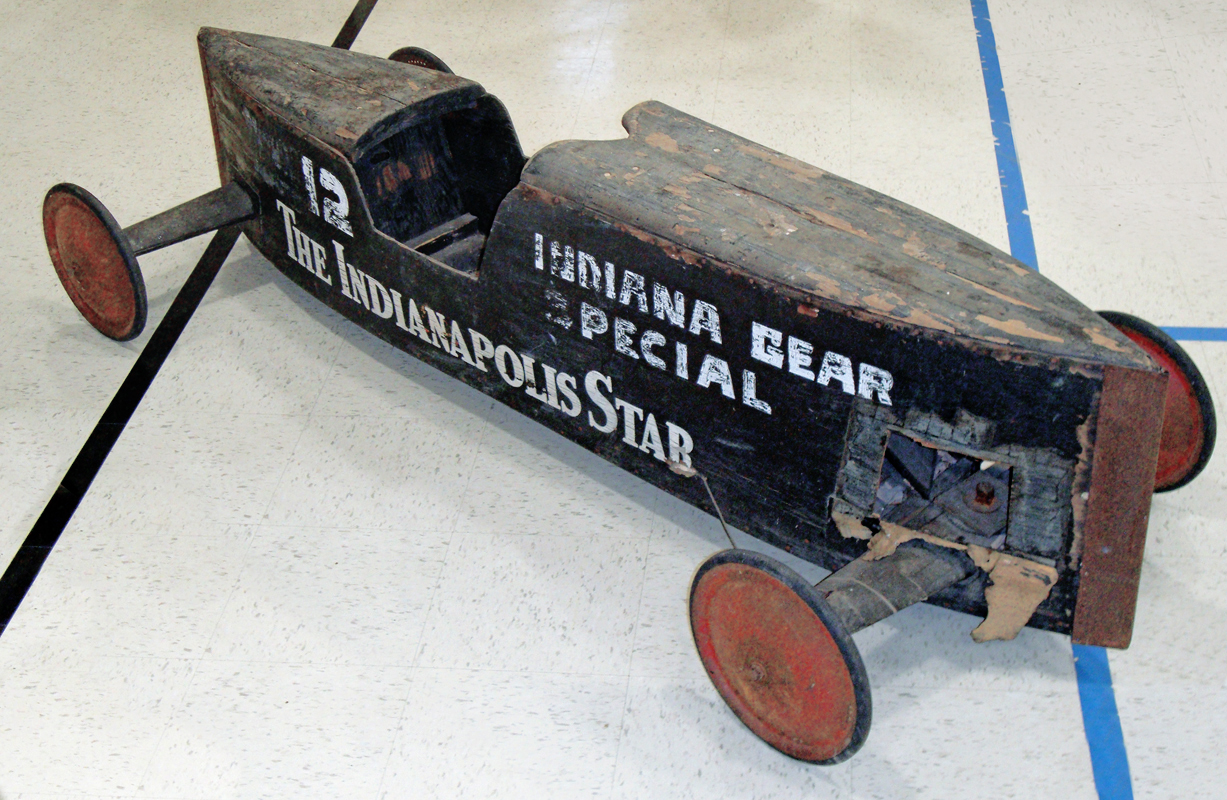
Oldest car at the 2023 2nd Annual Vintage Derby Car Show, piloted by Indianapolis, Indianapolis Champion David M. Knight in 1953

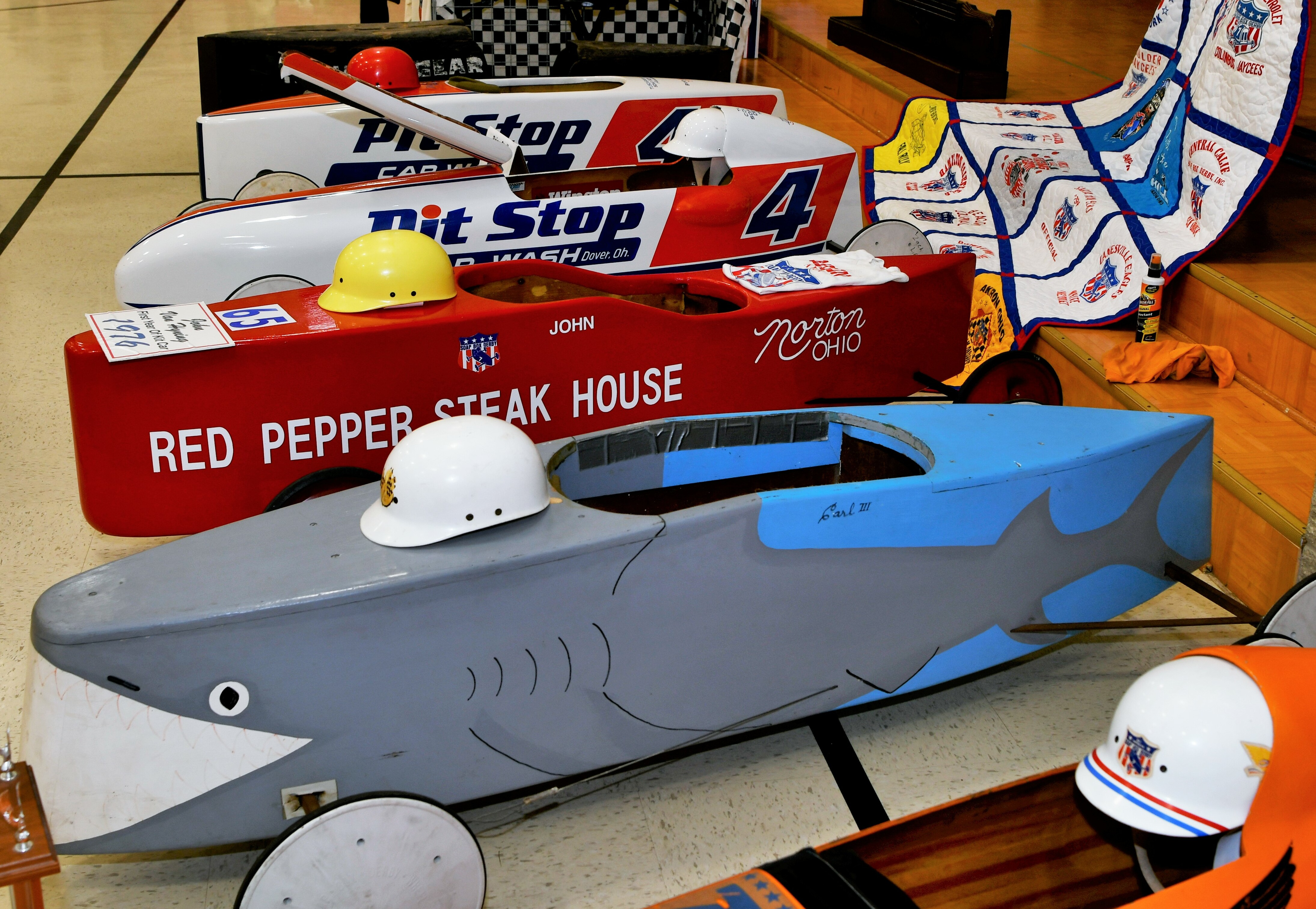
A lineup of various designs at the 2nd Annual Vintage Derby Car Show in Akron, Ohio on July 21, 2023

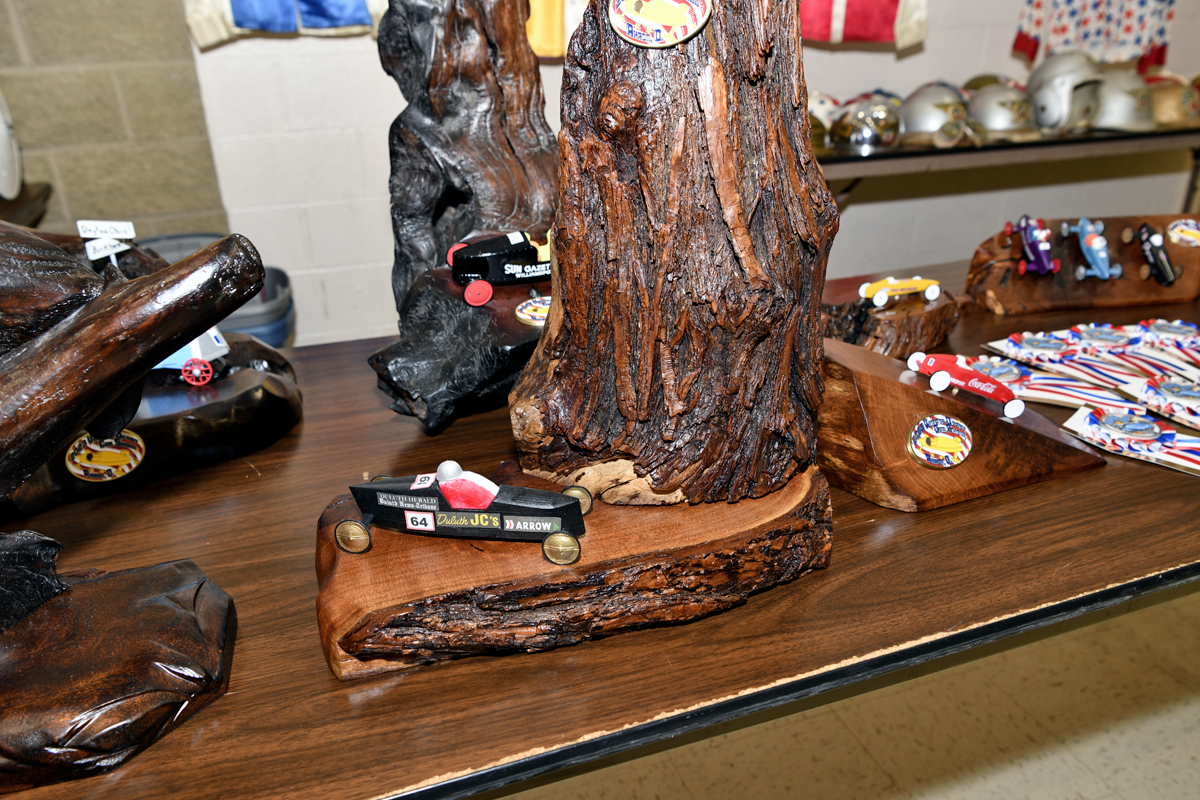
Trophy table at the 2023 Derby Show, featuring ten trophies hand-crafted by event director Ken Cline

==== Images of 2024 show ====
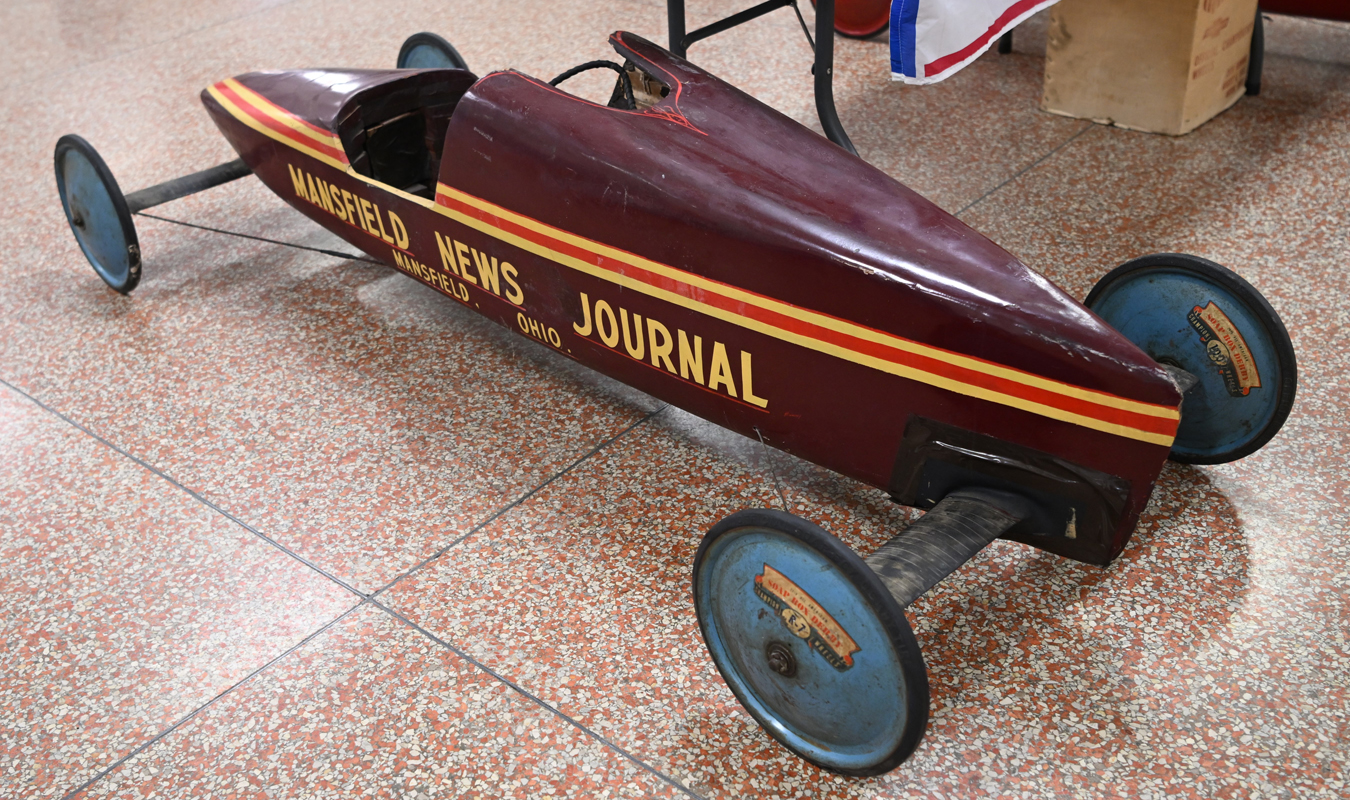
1961 Mansfield, Ohio Champion Timothy Boyer with clefted fore apron and boat tail rear end

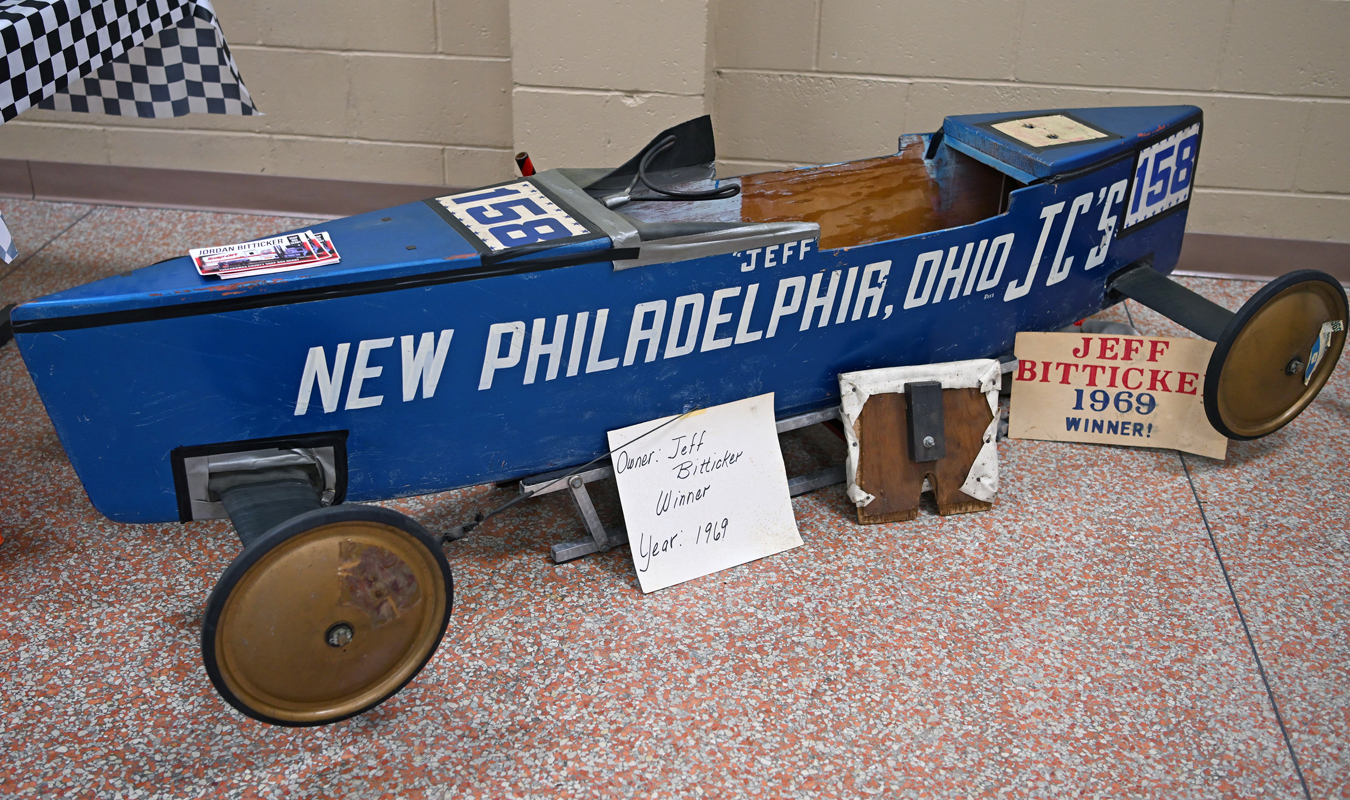
1969 New Philadelphia, Ohio Champion Jeff Bitticker's car on display

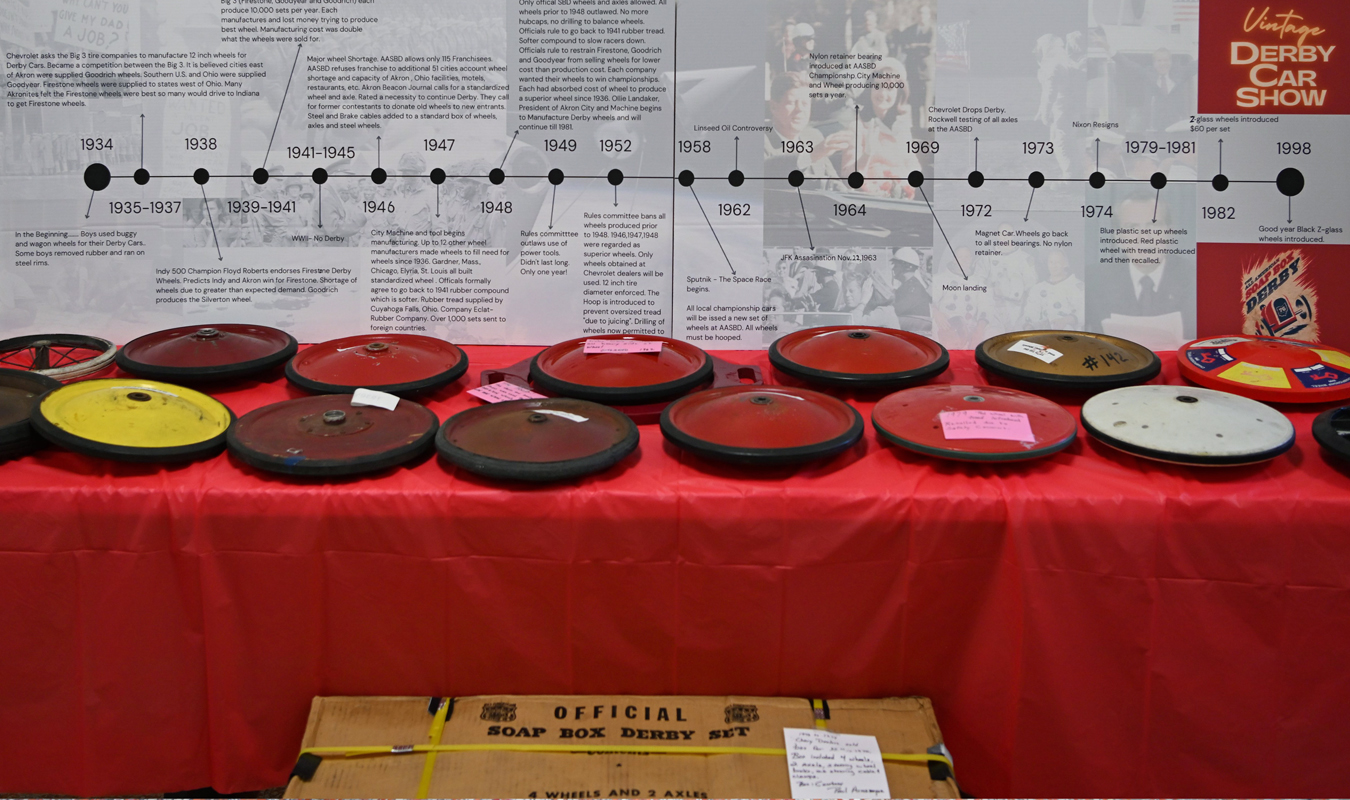
A display showcasing the historical timeline of the Official Soap Box Derby wheels over the years

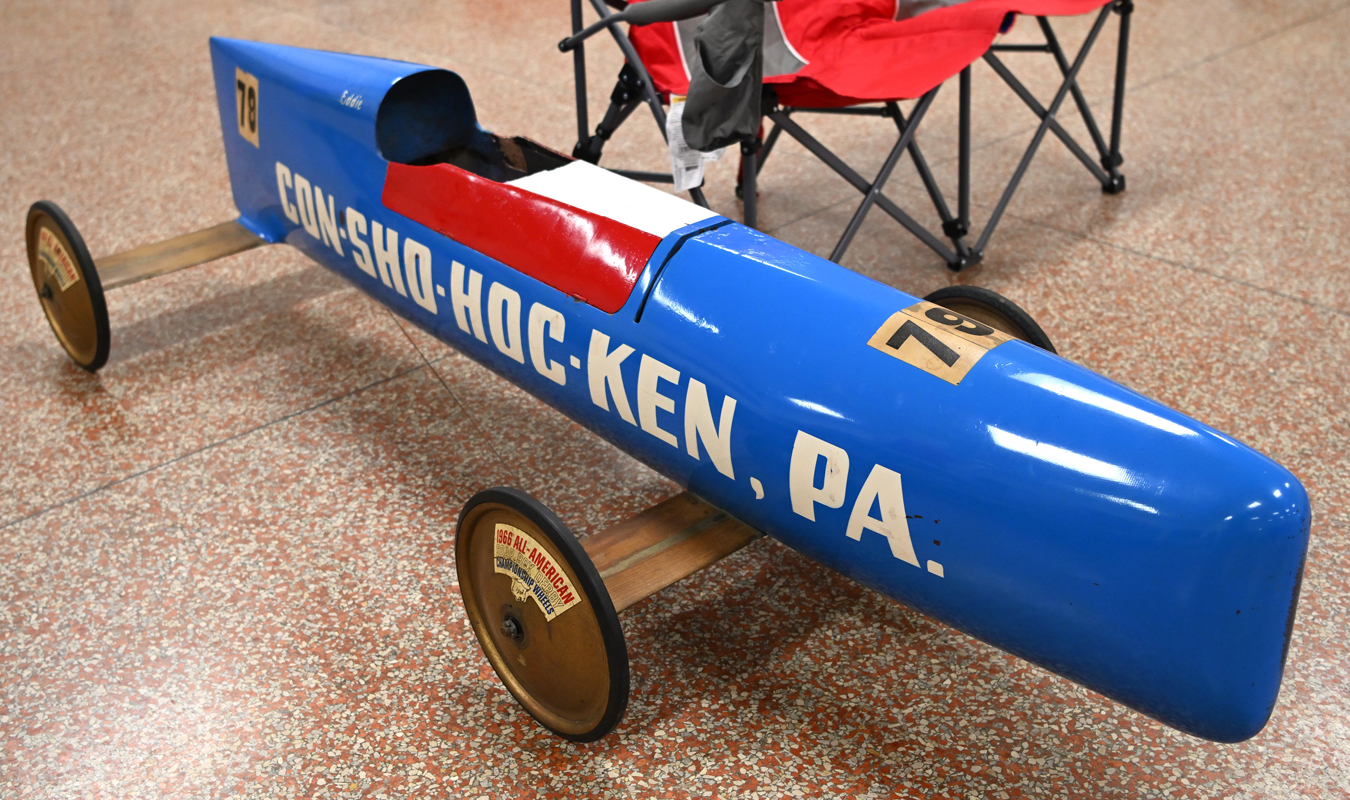
1974 Conshohocken, Pennsylvania Champion Edward L. Myers, who took 3rd at the 37th All-American

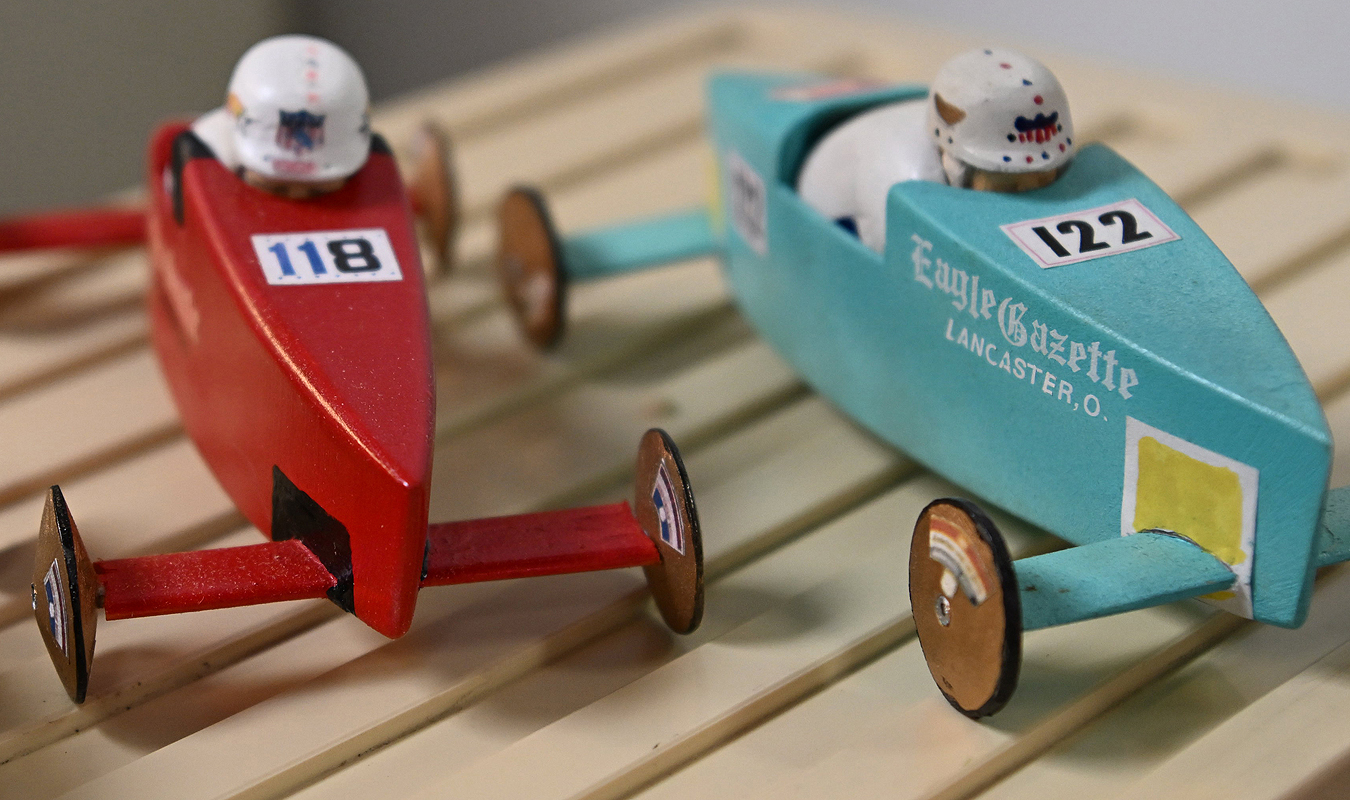
A closeup of two miniature Soap Box Derby models created by Derby historian and author Ron Reed

=== Notable appearances in media ===
==== Print ====
- Humdinger (1946) is a comic book series with action-packed Soapbox-derby cover by Al Fago on issue #1.
- Dell Comics produced a Howdy Doody comic book from 1950 to 1956, with Issue No. 35 (Oct—Dec 1955) featuring a Soap Box Derby-themed cover.
- The Buttons at the Soap Box Derby (1957) by Edith S McCall
- Tommy – Soap Box Derby Champion (1963) by Paul C. Jackson is a children's fiction novel.
- Screwball (1965) by Alberta Armer is about a character, crippled on his right side by polio, that puts his talents to work after receiving a rule book for the Detroit Soap Box Derby.
- Franklin's Soapbox Derby (2006) by Sharon Jennings is about characters Franklin and Bear building their own soapbox car to win the big race.
- I Want to Go to... The All-American Soap Box Derby Race (2003) by Kathy G. Johnson is the only fully illustrated children's book about the All-American Soap Box Derby.
- A Boy Named Sevin: Soap Box Cars and Surprises (2018) by Charlene Larioz is a children's novel about a five-year-old whose dad builds a soapbox car for the kids to enter into a neighborhood race.

==== Movies ====
- Kid Auto Races at Venice (1914) is the Little Tramp character, performed for the second time by Charlie Chaplin, being a nuisance to a director filming a soap box race.
- 1936 All-American Soap Box Derby (1936) is a General Motors-sponsored newsreel film of the 1936 All-American World Championship race in Akron, Ohio.
- Soap Box Derby (1940) is a British Pathé newsreel of the 1940 All-American.
- Soapbox Derby (1958) is a children's drama about a children's gang in London called The Battersea Bats building a car and entering it in a soapbox derby, with a rival gang, The Victoria Victors, setting out to steal its plans.
- Reel America-Soap Box Derby (1963) is a U.S. Information Agency film, originally called The Draggin' Wagon, that follows young African American Clarence Carter Jr. as he makes a Soap Box Derby car for the Washington, D.C., local race.
- The Day the Derby Almost Died – The Magnet Car (1973) is a short film about the cheating scandal at the 1973 All-American.
- 25 Hill (2011) is a feature drama film written and directed by Corbin Bernsen about a boy, shattered when his soldier father is killed in Afghanistan, building a racer with the help of fire chief who was devastated by the loss of his firefighter son on 9/11. The film was shot at Derby Downs in 2010.

==== Television ====
- The Soap Box Derby (1957) is the 11th episode of season 5 of the television series Make Room for Daddy, where Danny and Mr. Daly each build a different cart for Rusty to drive in the Soap Box Derby.
- Soap-Box Derby (1961) is the 27th episode of season 1 of the television series My Three Sons about second-oldest son Robbie Douglas building a Soap Box Derby racer.
- The Soapbox Derby (1963) is the 30th episode of season 2 of the television series Dennis the Menace, where character Johnny Brady builds a car for a soap box derby, so Dennis decides to build one also.
- Soap Box Derby (1966) is the 16th episode of season 3 of the television series Bewitched about a neighborhood boy racing at the All-American.
- ABC Wide World of Sports covered the 42nd All-American Soap Box Derby on August 11, 1979, with track-side commentary by Michael Young, formerly of Kids Are People Too.
- The Last Straw (1980) is the 19th episode of season 8 of the television series The Waltons about a boy building and racing a soap box car.
- Lucky Charm/Soap Box Derby (1985) is the 3rd episode of season 1 of the children's animated television series The Care Bears Family, where the Care Bears view a kart race where two boys brag about their car to two girls.
- Soap Box Derby (1986) is the 34th episode of season 3 of the children's series The Elephant Show, where Sharon, Lois, Bram and Elephant help the children construct a car and enter it in an exciting soap box derby.
- Saturdays of Thunder (1991) is the 8th episode of season 3 of the animated television series The Simpsons that has Bart Simpson building and racing a soap box car.
- Miracle in Lane 2 (2000) is a Disney Channel television movie based on the life of Justin Yoder, the first person with a disability to compete in the All American.
- Snoopy Presents: Welcome Home, Franklin (2024) is an animated television special released on February 16, 2024, on Apple TV+, about Franklin, the son of a military family, moving to a new town and bonding with Charlie Brown over racing in a Soap Box Derby.

== Sources ==
=== Books ===
- Cherrington, John (January 1, 1974). Mission on the Fraser (1st ed.). Mitchell Press. ASIN B0006CL344.
- Rosenthal, Sylvia A. (1980). Soap Box Derby Racing (1st ed.). Lorthop, Lee & Shepard Books. ISBN 978-0688519155.
- Fulton, David (1994). Winning Ingredients for Soap Box Derby Racers (2nd ed.). CreateSpace Publishing. ISBN 9781482049343.
- Payne, Melanie (2003). Champions, Cheaters, and Childhood Dreams: Memories of the Soap Box Derby. University of Akron Press. ISBN 978-1935603481. LCCN 2003008689.
- Iula, Jeff; Ignizio, Bill (2011). How I Saw It: My Photographic Memory of the Soap Box Derby. University of Akron Press. ISBN 978-1935603078.
- Reed, Ronald (2013). Tallmadge Hill: The story of the 1935 All-American Soap Box Derby (1st ed.). iUniverse. ISBN 978-1475978575.
- Reed, Ronald R. (2016). The All-American Soap Box Derby: A Review of the Formative Years – 1938 thru 1941. Arthur House. ISBN 978-1504977227.
- Eller, Richard (2024). Down the Hill: A Race to Remember. Redhawk Publications. ISBN 978-1959346449.
- McCall, Edith S. (1957). The Buttons At The Soap Box Derby. Benefic Press.

=== Periodicals ===
- Klecan, Gilbert (May 1947). "Building the Derby Winner". Mechanix Illustrated Magazine. pp. 112–115, 160.
- Brower, Ollie (August 1984). "Energy". Derby Tech Magazine.
- Brower, George (December 1985). "Profiles and Courage". Derby Tech Magazine.
- Brower, George (October 1990). "Weight a Minute". Derby Tech Magazine.
- Finwall, Bruce (August 1992). "Aerodynamics of Airfoils". Derby Tech Magazine.

=== News ===
- "Engineer Give Soap Box Derby Trophy". Dayton Daily News. August 5, 1934. p. 6 – via Newspapers.com.
- "Here are Winners in National and State Soap Box Races". Dayton Daily News. August 20, 1934. p. 13 – via Newspapers.com.
- Waterhouse, Helen S. (August 21, 1935). "Derbyists Now Peppers". Akron Beacon Journal. p. 17 – via Newspapers.com.
- "Soap-Box Racers May Get Wheels". Muncie Star Press. June 1, 1936. p. 1 – via Newspapers.com.
- "Attention Boys and Girls". Davenport Daily Times. August 3, 1936. p. 13 – via Newspapers.com.
- Schlemmer, James W. (October 15, 1936). "Rules Not Official Until November Meeting: Wheel Sizes". Akron Beacon Journal. p. 33 – via Newspapers.com.
- "Wheel Shortage in Derby Acute". New Brunswick Home News. July 12, 1937. p. 7 – via Newspapers.com.
- "11-Year-Old Hampstead Youth Wins First Local Soap Box Derby". The Gazette. Montreal. October 10, 1938. pp. 13, 19 – via Newspapers.com.
- "Hold Tight There, Feller!". El Paso Herald-Post. June 12, 1939. p. 7 – via Newspapers.com.
- "Soap Box Derby Clinic Opens Sunday With Schoolboy Racers". Akron Beacon Journal. July 6, 1939. p. 22 – via Newspapers.com.
- "Derby, in Sixth Year, has Enjoyed Amazing Growth in Popularity". Akron Beacon Journal. August 13, 1939. p. 12 – via Newspapers.com.
- "Official Soap Box Derby Rules". Rapid City Journal. June 6, 1940. p. 7 – via Newspapers.com.
- "Soap Box Derby Clinic Program Being Readied". Akron Beacon Journal. April 26, 1946. p. 33 – via Newspapers.com.
- "West Coast Boy Derby King". Akron Beacon Journal. August 19, 1946. p. 1 – via Newspapers.com.
- "Grooming His Steed for the Race". Iowa City Press-Citizen. July 21, 1947. p. 9 – via Newspapers.com.
- "Victory Banquet Big Climax to Derby Day For 135 Happy Racers". Akron Beacon Journal. August 18, 1947. p. 15 – via Newspapers.com.
- "Dimensions of Cars Unchanged". Akron Beacon Journal. May 31, 1948. p. 21 – via Newspapers.com.
- Owen, Bennett (August 14, 1948). "Oakwood Boys' "Spontaneous" Idea Grew and Grew". Dayton Journal Herald. p. 10 – via Newspapers.com.
- "Derby Champs Get Awards At Closing Banquet". Akron Beacon Journal. August 15, 1949. p. 13.
- "Laminated Bodies Prohibited". Cumberland Evening Times. April 13, 1950. p. 25.
- "Local Champion's Plaque". Lubbock Evening Journal. July 3, 1950. p. 3.
- "New Rules Permit Any Type Tool on 1950 Racer". Rapid City Journal. July 21, 1950. p. 34.
- "Only Official Derby Wheels Made in '48 or Later Permitted". The San Bernardino County Sun. June 25, 1950. p. 6.
- "Soap Box Derby Rules". Owensboro Messenger-Inquirer. June 30, 1950. p. 26.
- "Banquet Honors 147 Champs". Akron Beacon Journal. August 14, 1950. p. 15.
- "Laminated Construction Now Allowed on Racers". The Owensboro Messenger. July 7, 1951. p. 29.
- "Cars Stored In Huge Garage Before Derby". Waco Tribune-Herald. June 29, 1952. p. 47.
- "Joe Lunn Wins in Patched-Up Racer". The Columbus Ledger. August 11, 1952. p. 1.
- Pilkinton, Constance (August 15, 1952). "'Fairy Tale' Win Thrills Georgia Soap Box Mom". The Columbus Ledger. p. 1.
- Shover, William (August 9, 1953). "151 Soap Box Derby Champions". Indianapolis Star. p. 3.
- "Soap Box Derby Rules Changed". Lubbock Avalanche-Journal. January 17, 1954. p. 9.
- "German Boy Coasts 30 MPH To Win Derby". Akron Beacon Journal. July 26, 1954. p. 17.
- "Building A Winner Takes Neither Age Nor Genius". The Lima News. April 21, 1955. p. 16.
- "Los Angeles Speedster Built Slowly". The Lima News. April 21, 1955. p. 16.
- "No Mystery to 'Four-Point Suspension'". The Lima News. April 21, 1955. p. 16.
- "Wheels Are Most Vital". The Lima News. April 21, 1955. p. 16.
- "Derby Awards Dinner Held At Tower Park". Vidette-Messenger of Porter County. July 8, 1955. p. 7.
- "Award Winners". Tallahassee Democrat. July 14, 1955. p. 13.
- "Soap Box Derby Racer Runs in Spite of Cancer". The Indianapolis News. July 27, 1956. p. 21.
- "Lung Cancer Kills Youth and the Dream of His Lifetime". The Salem News. July 31, 1956. p. 3.
- "Will-to-Live of Cancer Sticken Boy Dies in Crash of His Racer". Valley Morning Star. August 1, 1956. p. 1.
- United Press (August 2, 1956). "Boy Fought Lung Cancer to Enter Soap Box Race". The Montreal Star. p. 25.
- "Irish Champ". Akron Beacon Journal. August 3, 1956. p. 1.
- "Soap Box Derby entries lag". Tallahassee Democrat. May 12, 1957. p. 9.
- "First Winner". Vidette-Messenger of Porter County. July 31, 1957. p. 6.
- "Here's Derby Prize List". Akron Beacon Journal. August 19, 1957. p. 19.
- Ratliff, C.W. (August 19, 1957). "City Boy Fails In Derby Try". Lubbock Evening Journal. p. 2.
- "Sponsors Extend Open Invitation". Indianapolis Star. March 9, 1958. p. 7.
- Barnet, Bob (April 1, 1958). "Soap Box Date Set". Muncie Star Press. p. 7.
- Bird, John (August 18, 1958). "Derby Filled With Human Touches". Akron Beacon Journal. p. 14.
- "Bobby Cecil reigns again as soap box derby champ". The Bend Bulletin. July 6, 1959. p. 2.
- "Former Chevy Boss M. E. Coyle is Dead". Akron Beacon Journal. September 28, 1961. p. 55.
- "Boys Take Peek Into Future At Soap Box Derby Clinic". Democrat and Chronicle. January 21, 1962. p. 7 – via Newspapers.com.
- "Illustrations From The 1962 Official Rule Book". Wausau Daily Herald. May 2, 1962. p. 23.
- "Safety And Fair Play Assured By '62 Rules". Owensboro Messenger-Inquirer. June 23, 1962. p. 9.
- "Excitement at High Pitch At Soap Box Derby Clinic". Wichita Eagle. June 23, 1962. p. 18 – via Newspapers.com.
- "For Mike Echols and 182 Buddies—A Real 'Bonanza'". Muncie Star Press. August 6, 1962. p. 9.
- "Laminated construction". Akron Beacon Journal. February 18, 1965. p. 12.
- "Many Racer Fashioned After Previous Winners". Owensboro Messenger-Inquirer. June 26, 1965. p. 12.
- "Almost Totally Blind Boy Gets Racer Ready For Soap Box Derby". The Danville Register. June 27, 1965. p. 12.
- "Blind Youth Enters Derby; Wins a Race". The Roanoke Times. July 18, 1965. p. 24.
- Davies, James (July 18, 1966). "First Winner Recalls Big Hill Road Race in 1933". Dayton Journal Herald. p. 3.
- Schreiner, Dave (July 21, 1969). "Manitowoc Boy, 15, Wins Derby". The Sheboygan Press. p. 6.
- Sallot, Jeff (May 8, 1970). "'69 Winner Offers Advice To '70 Entries". Sheboygan Press. p. 13.
- Sallot, Jeff (June 28, 1970). "Saw First Derby in 1935". Akron Beacon Journal. p. 53.
- "Tester Racing Strip Taking Shape". Vidette-Messenger of Porter County. May 17, 1971. p. 5 – via Newspapers.com.
- "55 Entered in 32nd Annual Soap Box Race". Vidette-Messenger of Porter County. July 2, 1971. p. 1 – via Newspapers.com.
- Sallot, Jeff (July 19, 1972). "Last Race Was Scary". The Odessa American. p. 11.
- "Derby Hopes are Brightened". Akron Beacon Journal. October 10, 1972. p. 33.
- "Hopes Brighten For Continuing Soap Box Derby". Akron Beacon Journal. October 11, 1972. p. 18.
- Young, Rox (May 10, 1973). "Scotty's back home". Dayton Journal Herald. p. 39.
- "'Unfair' Charges Are Hurled In Derby". Akron Beacon Journal. August 1, 1973. p. 43 – via Newspapers.com.
- Burick, Sy (September 2, 1973). "Si'ings". Dayton Daily News. p. 45.
- Kuebler, Joseph (September 15, 1973). "Soap Box Derby 'Didn't fit in contemporary America'". Akron Beacon Journal. p. 15.
- "Akron Chamber Withdraws Soap Box Derby Sponsorship". The Mercury. December 29, 1973. p. 16.
- "New idea of Soap Box Derby". Mount Vernon Argus. February 4, 1974. p. 11 – via Newspapers.com.
- "Critic Say New Rules Cater to Professionals". Akron Beacon Journal. June 30, 1974. p. 26 – via Newspapers.com.
- Cirillo, Joan J. (June 28, 1974). "Back to basics at Derby Day". Yonkers Herald Statesman. p. 47.
- "Matched Wheels Seen Cutting Cries Off Cheating". Akron Beacon Journal. July 14, 1974. p. 22 – via Newspapers.com.
- "New Format Snarls Race". Akron Beacon Journal. July 21, 1974. p. 9.
- "Derby Crown Remains in Calif. Family". Lancaster, PA Sunday News. August 18, 1974. p. 24.
- Bitterman, Susan (September 10, 1974). "Derby Aides Say Fuss May Help". Akron Beacon Journal. p. 11.
- "Soap Box Derby Set For Tonight". Greenville News. July 25, 1975. p. 27.
- von Sternberg, Bob (November 15, 1975). "Volunteers came to the rescue". Akron Beacon Journal. p. 60.
- "Girl Wins Soap Box Derby". Detroit Free Press. August 17, 1975. p. 55.
- Downing, Bob (November 24, 1975). "Barberton company saves Soap Box Derby". Akron Beacon Journal. p. 1.
- "Happy beginning set by soap-box savior". Akron Beacon Journal. November 25, 1975. p. 6.
- Simmons, Sandy (January 29, 1976). "Soap Box Derby Wants You to Believe!". Columbus Ledger-Enquirer. p. 1.
- Downing, Bob (February 16, 1976). "Golf, school shift date of derby to Aug. 14". Akron Beacon Journal. p. 40.
- "Wahl is new Derby chairman". Akron Beacon Journal. February 16, 1976. p. 40.
- Downing, Bob (July 21, 1976). "Looking Good". Akron Beacon Journal. p. 17.
- "Akron's derby camp". Akron Beacon Journal. August 13, 1976. p. 54.
- "The derby race is tomorrow". Akron Beacon Journal. August 13, 1976. p. 54.
- Norberg, John (February 22, 1977). "Soap box derby program grows to 3 events". Lafayette Journal and Courier. p. 3.
- "62 to compete for derby titles". Dover Daily Reporter. June 23, 1977. p. 13.
- Dervarics, Charles (August 20, 1981). "16 qualify as finalists in derby race". Allentown Morning Call. p. 29.
- "Waterloo boy places in derby competition". Waterloo Courier. August 22, 1977. p. 5.
- "Lexington man heads National Derby Rallies". The Pantagraph. October 13, 1977. p. 10.
- "McCandless boy rolls soap box to national championship". News Record. September 28, 1979. p. 26.
- "Heat by heat result of the derby". Akron Beacon Journal. August 17, 1980. p. 7.
- Peacock, Nancy (July 8, 1981). "Derby won't roll on plastic wheel". Akron Beacon Journal. p. D1-D2.
- "26th Soap Box Derby Sunday". Lancaster Eagle-Gazette. July 16, 1981. p. 15.
- "Out of the past". Akron Beacon Journal. August 8, 1981. p. 39.
- Peacock, Nancy (August 11, 1981). "Racers carved in miniature". Akron Beacon Journal. p. 47.
- "Fiberglass cars". Akron Beacon Journal. August 12, 1981. p. 98.
- "Miniature cars". Tri-City Herald. October 31, 1981. p. 22.
- "Akron's realty program wins national award". Akron Beacon Journal. December 17, 1981. p. 19.
- Stock, Derek (July 19, 1982). "Derby 'loser' is champ". Akron Beacon Journal. p. 1.
- "The Men". Akron Beacon Journal. August 8, 1982. p. 173.
- Lawson, Gracie (August 8, 1982). "Derby cars: New shapes, same speed". Akron Beacon Journal. p. 182.
- Peacock, Nancy (June 24, 1983). "'Timer swap' system in derby is criticized as time consuming". Akron Beacon Journal. p. 16.
- Byland, Kathleen (June 26, 1983). "A Soap Box tradition". Akron Beacon Journal. p. 9.
- Peacock, Nancy (August 8, 1983). "Derby to keep rolling with plastic wheels". Akron Beacon Journal. p. D1-D3.
- Love, Steve (August 11, 1983). "What we need is THE Derby book...". Akron Beacon Journal. p. 33.
- Sparks, Larry (July 13, 1984). "Soap-Box Cars Will Head for the Hill". Omaha World-Herald. p. 21.
- Cole, Patrick E. (August 7, 1985). "Soap Box Derby Derby Hall of Fame provides a glimpse of the past". Akron Beacon Journal. p. 57.
- Cole, Patrick E. (August 7, 1985). "Derby Hall of Fame: A trip to the past". Akron Beacon Journal. p. 6.
- "Looking backward". Vidette-Messenger of Porter County. July 9, 1987. p. 2.
- Fernandez, Robert (August 15, 1987). "13-year-old continues family's derby legacy". Akron Beacon Journal. pp. 6–7.
- "Soap Box Derby". Akron Beacon Journal. August 7, 1989. p. 61.
- "First National Bank is proud sponsor of Derby". Akron Beacon Journal. August 7, 1989. p. 61.
- "Soap Box Derby Facts". Akron Beacon Journal. August 11, 1989. p. A5.
- "Race Divisions". Akron Beacon Journal. July 14, 1993. p. B-3.
- Kosky, Ken (June 19, 1994). "Fun, excitement of Soap Box Derby never changes". Vidette-Messenger of Porter County. p. 2.
- Head, Tami D. (July 1, 1994). "Derby novice had hectic day; more to come". Akron Beacon Journal. p. C4.
- "Soap Box Derby results announced". The Herald-Palladium. August 30, 1994. p. 14 – via Newspapers.com.
- Adams, David (August 3, 1997). "$3.5 Million fix-up eyed at Derby Downs". Akron Beacon Journal. p. 8.
- "All-American Soap Box Derby: A look Back". Akron Beacon Journal. August 3, 1997. p. 8.
- "How The Derby Is Run". Akron Beacon Journal. August 3, 1998. p. B3.
- Quinn, Jim (October 6, 1998). "Soap box derby founder Myron Scott dead at 91". Akron Beacon Journal. p. 1, A12.
- Dyer, Stephen (August 1, 1999). "Heated Heats!". Akron Beacon Journal. p. 9.
- Vrandenburg, Sarah (July 21, 2000). "New finish-line bridge worth $250,000 now spans Akron track". Akron Beacon Journal. p. 30.
- Steinhauser, Rick (July 28, 2001). "Race Divisions". Akron Beacon Journal. p. AA3.
- "All-American Soap Box Derby 1933–2001". Akron Beacon Journal. July 28, 2001. p. AA3.
- "NASCAR to sponsor Soap Box Derby". Chillicothe Gazette. July 7, 2002. p. 9.
- Sumbry, Teri (July 27, 2002). "The Ramblin' Wreck". Columbus Ledger-Enquirer. p. 27.
- Archdeacon, Tom (July 20, 2003). "Dayton Embraced Soap Box Derby". Dayton Daily News. p. C1 & C7.
- "Derby Day 2003". Akron Beacon Journal. July 25, 2003. p. F005.
- "Soap Box Derby 1933–2001". Akron Beacon Journal. July 27, 2005. p. C8.
- "Area derby racers to take on world". Rochester Democrat and Chronicle. July 30, 2005. p. 16.
- "Johnson fulfills NASCAR dream". Oakland Tribune. June 15, 2006. p. 56.
- Carney, Jim (October 13, 2007). "Derby car sent to Indy 500 museum". Akron Beacon Journal. p. B5.
- Harris, Doug (May 27, 2008). "First Soap Box Derby Champion". Dayton Daily News. p. B3.
- Biliczky, Carol (July 1, 2008). "All-American Soap Box Derby, an Akron tradition, needs help". Mansfield News-Journal. p. 11.
- Kinton, Jami (December 14, 2009). "Lawsuit alarms derby officials". Mansfield News Journal. p. 1.
- Biliczky, Carol (March 29, 2012). "FirstEnergy powers derby". Akron Beacon Journal. p. A001-A003.
- "Get up to speed on seven decades of derby history". Akron Beacon Journal. July 15, 2012. p. A001 & A004.
- "Soap Box Derby at 75". Akron Beacon Journal. July 17, 2012. p. A008.
- "Soap Box Derby clinic". Culpeper Star-Exponent. April 1, 2012. p. 2 – via Newspapers.com.
- Highland, Deborah (April 8, 2012). "Young racers test their wheels". Park City Daily News. p. A3 – via Newspapers.com.
- Livingston, Doug (July 26, 2013). "Carver's derby car models continue to chronicle racers". Akron Beacon Journal. p. A001 & A005.* British Pathé (April 13, 2014). "Soap Box Derby (1940)". YouTube.
- Biliczky, Carol (July 21, 2014). "Derby in better financial shape as it opens today". Akron Beacon Journal. p. A001.
- Miller, Marilyn (November 15, 2014). "New Plan, New Focus". Akron Beacon Journal. p. A001.
- Hancock, Brian (March 26, 2015). "Soap Box Derby looking to grow this year". The Franklin Favorite. p. C2.
- "Gearing Up For Soap Box Derby". Culpeper Star-Exponent. April 13, 2015. p. 7 – via Newspapers.com.
- Miller, Jimmy (July 22, 2015). "Go, speed racers, go!". Akron Beacon Journal. p. B001.
- Antoniotti, Kathy (August 10, 2015). "Racing Back in Time to 1935". Akron Beacon Journal. p. B001-B004.
- Thurston, Trista (June 26, 2016). "Annual derby fun for 38 kids, families". Lancaster Eagle-Gazette. p. A3.
- Bell, Diane (July 26, 2017). "'The Graphite Kid' returns to lead national soap box derby parade". San Diego Union Tribune.
- McIntyre, Barbara (February 10, 2019). "Book looks at Soap Box Derby's glory days". Akron Beacon Journal. p. E4.
- McKinnon, Jim (July 18, 2019). "Derby retains title sponsor". Akron Beacon Journal. p. B1.
- Ashworth, Alan (June 14, 2021). "Science, thrill of competition drive racers in local derby". Akron Beacon Journal. p. B1.
- Price, Mark J. (July 19, 2021). "'I'll Never Forget That'". Akron Beacon Journal. p. A1.
- Beans, Tawney (July 24, 2021). "Not Just a 'Boy's Race". Akron Beacon Journal. p. B1.
- "Tradition rolls on: The running of the derby". Akron Beacon Journal. July 28, 2021. p. W002.
- "83rd FirstEnergy All-American Soap Box Derby Champions/Legacy Division". Akron Beacon Journal. August 1, 2021. p. C16 – via Newspapers.com.
- "84th FirstEnergy All-American". Akron Beacon Journal. July 17, 2022. p. B6.
- Price, Mark J. (July 19, 2022). "'One of the greatest boys' events in the world'". Akron Beacon Journal. p. B6.
- Price, Mark J. (July 9, 2023). "Little mysteries from the Soap Box Derby". Akron Beacon Journal. p. B5.
- Clarke, Grace (July 15, 2023). "Gearing up as Soap Box Derby parade, races return to Akron". Akron Beacon Journal. p. A1.
- "84th FirstEnergy All-American Soap Box Derby Champions/Top 3 in Legacy Division". Akron Beacon Journal. July 31, 2022. p. C3 – via Newspapers.com.
- "Former derby racer and UA grad tapped to lead Soap Box Derby as new CEO". Akron Beacon Journal. November 11, 2025.

=== Websites ===
- "FEAASBD". Soap Box Derby.
- "About: Trademark & Logo Usage Guidelines". Soap Box Derby.
- "Board of Directors". Soap Box Derby.
- "Getting started". Soap Box Derby.
- "History". Soap Box Derby.
- "Hall of Fame". Soap Box Derby.
- "Hall of Fame Members-Ken Cline". Soap Box Derby.
- "Hall of Fame Members-Jeff Iula". Soap Box Derby.
- "Hall of Fame Members-Ron Reed". Soap Box Derby.
- "Hall of Fame Museum". Soap Box Derby.
- "Legacy Division". Web Archive. Archived from the original on February 7, 2023.
- "Rally Race Program". Soap Box Derby.
- "Staff". Soap Box Derby.
- "Locations – Canada". Soap Box Derby.
- "Lincoln Soap Box Derby". Soap Box Derby.
- "ISBD 2022 Annual Report". HeyZine Flipbooks.
- "Ultimate Speed Racing" (PDF). Web Archive. Archived from the original (PDF) on February 12, 2011.
- "NDR".
- "NDR-About". NDR.
- "NDR-Nationals". NDR.
- "Ronald Reed". Amazon.com.
- "Soapbox Derby". Museum of American Speed.
- "U.S. History Primary Source Timeline". Library of Congress.
- "Everything "First" in St. Catharines History". Facebook.
- "Soap Box Derby". Apple TV. March 30, 1961.
- "Virginia Guide, Volume 90, Number 6, 1 April 1964". Virginia Chronicle. April 1, 1964.
- "42nd All-American Soap Box Derby – August 11, 1979". YouTube. August 11, 1979.
- "Mission Soapbox History". Mission and District Soap Box Derby Association.
- Deford, Frank (August 1, 1988). "Real Boys: The Author Unearths a Jewel of Yesteryear at the 50th All-American Soap Box Derby". Sports Illustrated. Archived from the original on November 2, 2023.
- "Parts & Prices". Web Archive. December 2, 1998. Archived from the original on April 27, 1999.
- Paukner, Steffen (November 22, 2007). "Die Seifenkistenräder – Eine Übersicht". Soap-Box-Derby.de.
- "1957 Soap Box Derby Racer". Wisconsin Historical Society. August 31, 2009.
- "Parade Float with Soap Box Derby Cars". Wisconsin Historical Society. August 31, 2009.
- "Here are some pictures of my car". Jalopy Journal. November 4, 2009.
- "Main Court Room Gallery". Lynchburg Museum. 2010.
- "Corbin Bernsen steers '25 Hill' to rescue soap box derby". USA Today. April 7, 2010.
- Iula, Jeff; Ignizio, Bill (July 21, 2011). "How I Saw It: My Photographic Memory of the Soap Box Derby". University of Akron Press Publications.
- Schleis, Paula (July 15, 2012). "75 facts about the All-American Soap Box Derby". Akron Beacon Journal.
- "Richard McMahon Obituary". The Virginian-Pilot. June 1, 2013.
- "What We Leave Behind". Tumbler. October 22, 2014.
- sunivroc (July 10, 2015). "EMMR – Soap Box Derby Car". Flickr.
- "Soap Box Derby Memorabilia at Landmark General Store". Business Journal Daily. July 17, 2015.
- "1960 racer goes on display". Tribune Chronicle. July 25, 2015.
- "The 1936 All-American Soap Box Derby". YouTube. June 30, 2016.
- Edsall, Larry (June 7, 2016). "Does your collection include Soap Box Derby racers?". Classic Cars – The Journal.
- "Soap Box Derby Hall of Famers look back on car design that 'saved the derby'". Akron Beacon Journal. July 22, 2017.
- "Detroit's Soap Box Derby days". Detroit News. August 19, 2017.
- Fierro, Jennifer (June 14, 2017). "Llano Soapbox Derby Hall of Famer Made It Possible for Every Kid to Follow in His Tracks". 101highlandlakes.com.
- Dahlman, Ryan (October 4, 2018). "Soapbox derby history featured at Museum". Southwest Booster.
- Junk, Es (March 2019). "Stables Cafe decor". Google.
- Shinyuhan (December 2019). "Stables Cafe". Google.
- "Swift Current Soapbox Association". YouTube. March 10, 2021.
- "A Child's Life in the 1930s Compared to Today". Children's Theatre. September 28, 2021.
- "History from Here: The Lake Street Armoury". St. Catharines Museum Blog. November 7, 2021.
- Coan, Shannon (July 21, 2022). "Soap Box Derby memorabilia dating to first derby to be exhibited Friday". Akron Beacon Journal.
- Boyd, Kevin (July 29, 2022). "2022 1st vintage car show". Flickr.
- Andrews, Joe (July 30, 2021). "Johnny Buehler becomes youngest Local Soap Box world champion". Warrensburg Star-Journal.
- "Myers Industries Partners with Soap Box Derby". Soap Box Derby. February 6, 2023.
- "Soap Box Derby Introduces New Wheel for Race Competition". Soap Box Derby. July 7, 2023.
- Langenfeld, Danielle (July 17, 2023). "Soap Box Derby World Championships kick off in Akron". Nexstar Media Inc. – Fox8.
- American Marketing & Publishing (May 2023). "Logan's". Google.
- Boyd, Kevin (July 23, 2023). "2nd Annual Vintage Car Show 2023". Flickr.
- Noleff, George (August 11, 2023). "History Lesson: Winner of Star City Soap Box Derby recounts victory 77-years-ago". WXFR TV.
- "Champs on Display". Web Archive. August 15, 2023. Archived from the original on August 15, 2023.
- "Official Obituary of Rebecca "Becky" Mahoney". Zimmerman Brothers Funeral Home. September 10, 2023.
- "IG Seifenkisten Derby Schweiz — Das Original seit 1970!". IG Seifenkisten Derby Schweiz.
- "Seifenkistenklassen". Deutschen Seifenkisten Derby.
- "Humdinger #1 1946–1st issue-soap box derby race car-Mickey Starlight-G/VG". Amazon.
- "Humdinger (1946) comic books". My Comic Shop.
- Jackson, Paul C. "Tommy – Soap Box Derby Champion". Horse Books Plus.
- "Screwball Mass Market Paperback – January 1, 1965". Amazon. January 1965.
- Jennings, Sharon (August 2006). Franklin's Soapbox Derby (Kids Can Read) Paperback – August 1, 2006. Kids Can Press. ISBN 1553378199.
- "Franklin's Soapbox Derby". Kids Can Press.
- Johnson, Kathy G. (July 2003). I Want to Go to... The All-American Soap Box Derby Race Paperback – July 1, 2003. Creative Image Publishers. ISBN 0974266701.
- Larioz, Charlene (June 7, 2018). A Boy Named Sevin Soap Box Cars and Surprises Paperback – June 6, 2018. Xlibris US. ISBN 978-1984532602.
- "Soapbox Derby". IMDb.
- "The Day the Derby Almost Died – The Magnet Car". YouTube. April 16, 2016.
- "The Day the Derby Almost Died". All About Artists.
- "1963 Soap Box Derby". C-Span.
- "Soapbox Derby". Apple TV. December 26, 1966.
- "Season Eight Ep.19 – The Last Straw". All About The Waltons.
- "Howdy Doody #35". Hip Comic.
- "Soap Box Derby Clinic Plan Book" (PDF). Kenneth Lafferty Hess. 1963.
- "1965 All-American Soap Box Derby Clinic Guide" (PDF). Kenneth Lafferty Hess. 1965.
- "1968 Soap Box Derby Clinic Guide" (PDF). Kenneth Lafferty Hess. 1968.
- "FirstEnergy and International Soap Box Derby Race into the Future with Title Sponsorship Renewal". FirstEnergy Corp. July 19, 2024.
