= Kinsmen Coaster Classic =

Canadian kid's gravity-powered racing program

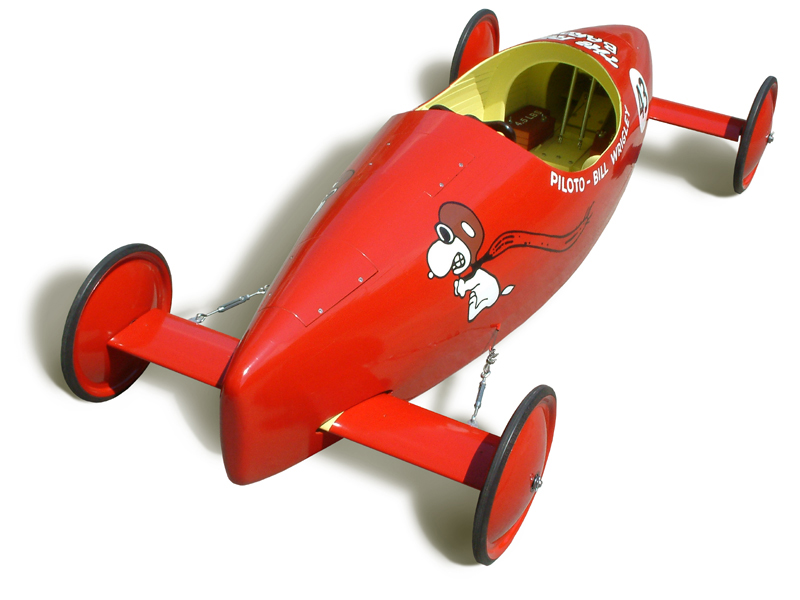
A Kinsmen Coaster Classic soap box racer from 1969

The Kinsmen Coaster Classic, also named the All Canada or All-Canadian Coaster Classic, was a youth-oriented soap box race car program that took place in the City of Montreal, Canada, from 1938 until the early 1970s. Organized by the Kinsmen Club of Montreal, it was the first city-wide soap box race to be held in the municipality. Cars competing in the event raced downhill, propelled by gravity alone. Competing in two separate classes, boys raced hand-made cars on various streets throughout the city until a permanent site was chosen in Montreal's east end.

The American Soap Box Derby was inaugurated in 1934, making Montreal one of Canada's earliest entries into the sport just four years later, as well as one of the first non-US entries worldwide. Rules for the race followed those of its US counterpart, with eligibility for boys set at ages 9–15, and a car construction allowance of no more than ten dollars in its inaugural year. Like in the US, boys were expected to build their own cars with as little assistance as possible from a senior mentor. Competitors from anywhere in Canada were welcomed to attend.

A winner of the Kinsmen Coaster Classic was awarded the Henry Birks Trophy and a brand new bicycle, with a second bicycle being awarded to the runner-up. In addition to the fastest car prizes, awards were handed out for Best Looking and Best Constructed cars. Although styled like the Soap Box Derby, the race was not affiliated with nor was it a registered franchise of the American Soap Box Derby organization (Note: An international, largely volunteer-based event, the sport is overseen by the All-American Soap Box Derby (AASBD) organization, comprising a paid administrative staff based at Derby Downs in Akron, OH) in Akron, OH, and therefore could not use their trademarked name nor refer to itself officially as the Montreal or Kinsmen 'Soap Box Derby', instead using the title 'Kinsmen Coaster Classic.' It did not send its champions to compete at the All-American World Championship in Akron.

In the Seventies public interest in the Soap Box Derby began to fade, brought on by an unforeseen loss of its national sponsor and a cheating scandal that damaged its credibility as a trusted American institution. At the same time the Kinsmen Coaster Classic lost its race venue in 1973 when the street it had used for twenty years was redeveloped for construction of Montreal's Olympic Park in preparation for the 1976 Summer Olympics.

== History ==
The Soap Box Derby began in the United States in 1934, founded by Dayton, Ohio, native Myron Scott, a photojournalist employed by the Dayton Daily News. For the first two years it hosted the All-American Soap Box Derby National Championship for boys from all across America, but in 1936 competitors from outside the US began competing as well. South Africa was the first country to send a foreign competitor, (Note: Norman Neumann of Pretoria won the South African Championship) with Canada following suit a year later with a champ from Belleville, Ontario. (Note: George Wilson of Belleville, Ontario, winner of the first Canadian Championship in Toronto, Ontario in 1937 represented Canada at the 4th All-American. He did not make it past the semi-final round of the International race.) Canada remained active in Soap Box Derby, having sent Champions to Akron for decades, its best showing at the All-American being Andy Vasko from St. Catharines, Ontario, who won third place in 1957.

In 1938 the Kinsmen Club of Montreal discussed plans to conduct its own soap box race, the first one for Montreal, as a means of raising charitable funds for under-privileged children in the city's poorer neighborhoods. An ophthalmological ward at a hospital was required, with the intention of offering free eye exams for the kids, and the idea was to raise funds from various groups and individuals that would be willing to sponsor contestants in the race. Race preparations were made to help boys that needed various items like axles and wheels, items they could not manufacture themselves, and a budget of no more than $10 with which to construct the car body was set, although most entrants seldom went over $1.

Leading up to the first race there were as many as 400 applicants wanting to participate, but that number was pared down significantly upon inspection of the cars, most being deemed unacceptable. The location of the race was kept secret until a few days before the event so that eager young lads would not venture out into traffic to test their cars. To govern against such an occurrence, organizers stipulated that if they did, they would be barred from entry.

Inaugural race

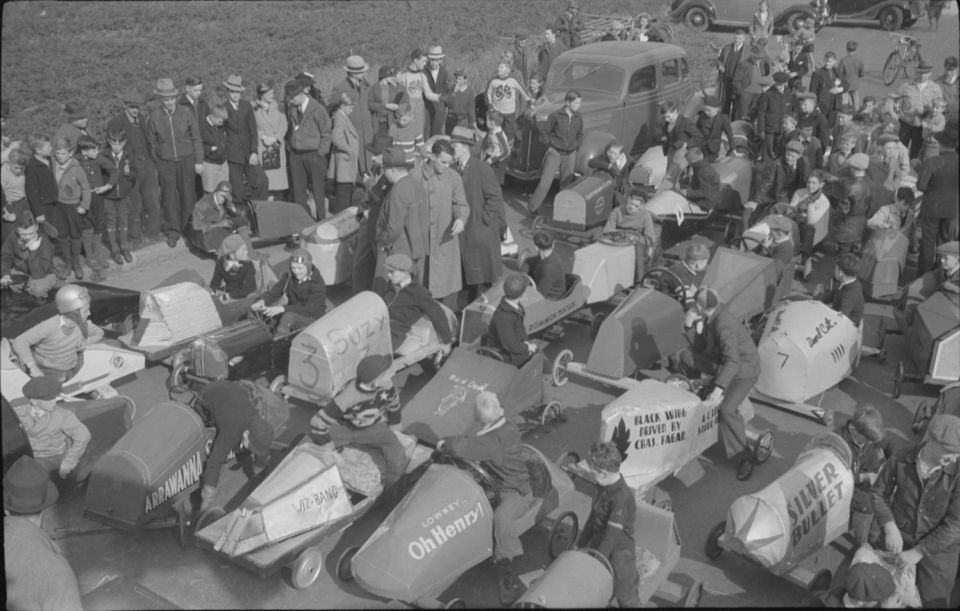
Photo by Conrad Poirier of the inaugural race, 8 Oct 1938

The first Kinsmen Coaster Classic was held on October 8, 1938, with fifty-six boys running as either class B (ages 9–12) or class A (ages 13–15) entries. Before a crowd of an estimated four-thousand, eleven-year-old Bill Telfer, driving his "Thunderbolt," defeated class A winner Leonard Applebaum, 14, in the final, becoming the first Kinsmen Coaster Classic champion. Award-winning Québécois photojournalist Conrad Poirier was present to document the event (pictured). Cars from the race were put on public display at the Eaton's Toyville on the forth floor, including Telfer's winning "Thunderbolt," and racers by Best Looking Car Award winners Hans Gruninger and Earl Mackintosh. The following year the race took place in Montreal's east end under an afternoon shower, with class A entry Sydney Wright, 14, taking the top prize, and Gus Mell, 12, winning in the class B category. Bill Telfer returned in his "Thunderbolt" and was cheered on by the crowd as he clocked an excellent time while testing the track, but after the rain began his car became hampered, and he lost to Mell in the semi-final round.

Annual races

Because it was also called the All Canada or All-Canadian Coaster Classic in the media, racers came not only from all over Montreal, but elsewhere in Quebec, British Columbia, New Brunswick, Newfoundland and Ontario. From 1941 to 1943 however, it was won by just one boy, Tommy Butters from NDG in Montreal, who was also runner-up in 1940. During his tenure he won in three categories; class B, class A and Ball Bearing class, and at three separate track venues. He also placed second in the Best Constructed car category the second year he was crowned champ.

From the same neighborhood was Richard Powell, who made excellent showings also by winning in 1951 and 1953, taking runner-up in his class in 1952. He won soap box races in other communities as well, taking home five bicycles in the three years he competed. From out of province, champs winning in 1950 and 1952 were (in order) Mervyn Roberts from Perth, ON, who won the Standard Trophy for best constructed car in 1949, and Bob Jackson from Oshawa, ON. Beginning in 1954, races were being dominated by boys from the same community east of Montreal, Shawinigin-Falls, QC, having two winning streaks of three years each and one streak of two. The 1969 champion, Peter Miller, who raced the year prior but damaged his car, hailed from Montreal's West Island community of Valois, QC.

Races continued annually up to the early seventies with the exception the Second World War, when they were suspended from 1944 to 1947. When the United States entered the War in 1941, the American Soap Box Derby suspended its races immediately, resuming in 1946. Not following suit, Kinsmen organizers felt that the successful fundraising benefits of the race to help Montreal's needy far outweighed the minute amount of rubber used by the boys needed for the war effort, and held off for two more years. Races resumed in Montreal in 1948.

== Rules ==
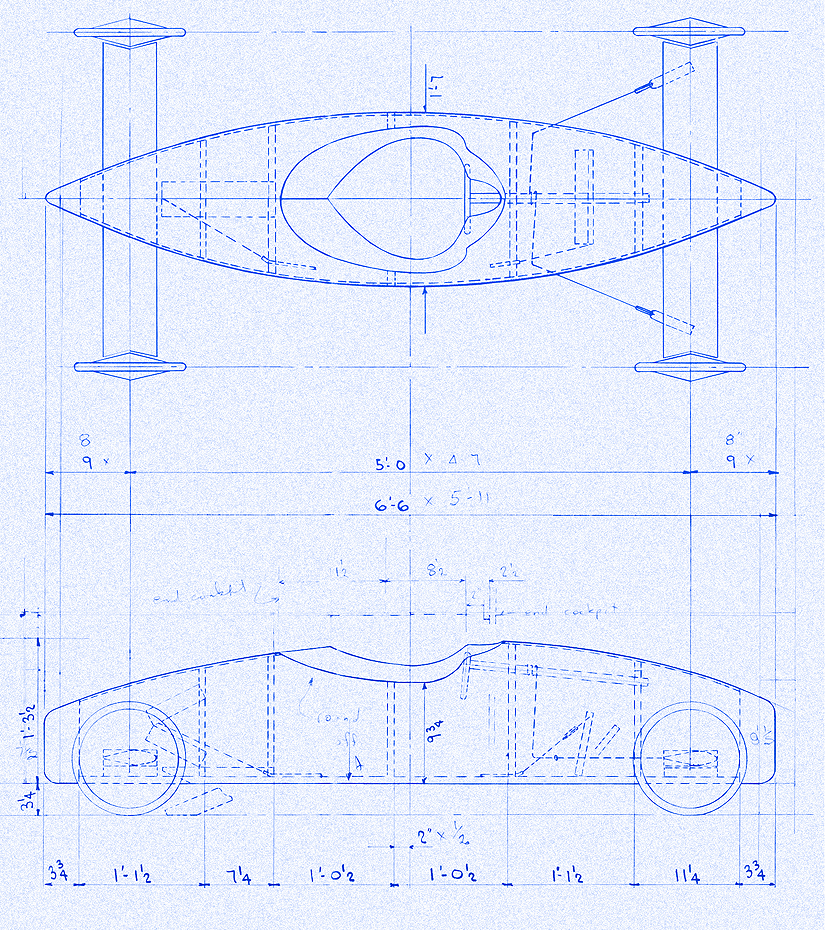
Construction blueprint for building a Soap Box Derby racer

The Kinsmen Coaster Classic was ostensibly a Soap Box Derby race, just not in name, and thus followed the rules set forth by its American counterpart so that, in the event that a boy was invited to compete at the All-American, he would pass inspection and thus qualify. In the end no champ ever attended officially. (Note: No boy from the Kinsmen Coaster Classic appears in any of the Official Race Programs of All-American Championship from 1938 to 1972)

One of Derby's first rules was that the car had to be boy built, without the assistance of a mentor. This was seldom the case, as most boys did require some help simply because they lacked the skills to perform such a feat, acquiring them eventually as the car was constructed while under the tutelage of an adult. Sometimes a boy was asked to demonstrate knowledge of how the car was built during inspection if judges had doubts about who actually built the car.

Boys raced in pairs down the hill (two lanes) in single elimination heats. Once a boy lost he was out of the race. Prior to the War, contestants were divided into two classes based on age: 9-12 raced as class B, 13–15 as class A, as stipulated by the Soap Box Derby in the US. In 1942 however, race officials redrew the distinction, this time by the kinds of wheels used, either "Ball bearing", the Official Derby wheels being used by boys in the States, or "plain bearing" or non-bearing wheels often found on wagons and baby carriages. In 1954 the classes were renamed. Although the distinction was the same, "ball bearing" became "Official wheel," (Note: A Soap Box Derby distinction. Official is capitalized to indicate the Official Soap Box Derby Wheel, the only issue allowed at sanctioned races in the US and Canada.) and "plain bearing" became "unofficial wheel." This practice continued until the end.

General restrictions concerning the car's construction included a maximum weight of 250 pounds for the car and driver together (verified during a weigh-in prior to the race), an overall length of no more than 72 inches or six feet, a wheelbase of no less than 40 inches, height not to exceed 30 inches and a wheel tread of between 30 and 36 inches. The front axle was mounted on a single kingpin, and directional control governed by steel cables, a single steering column and wheel. No ropes were allowed. The brake was to be a friction or drag type, usually an armature through the floor that was activated by a foot pedal. Wheels were to be the solid rubber type, not pneumatic, and measure no more than 12 inches. Finally the driver was to be seated upright, though the practice was to crouch forward to minimize wind resistance. Pre-race inspections verified that the car was well constructed according to strict observance of the rules, and safe to drive.

Mishaps

In spite of strict regulations ensuring safety for the boys, mishaps did occur. In the media at least one occurrence of a crash or crack-up was reported per race, sometimes about a boy requiring a trip to the hospital. In 1939 for example, both champion Sydney Wright and runner-up Gus Mell experienced crack-ups on their way to their individual victories, with Wright suffering damage but quickly repairing his car before the next heat.

At the 1952 race, a youngster stepped onto the track during a heat, with racer Allan Thompson of Lachine, Quebec voluntarily swerving, slamming into the curb at high-speed and breaking the insteps of both feet. He was rushed to the hospital. Runner-up Richard Powell, in a sportsman-like gesture, asked race officials to donate his second-place prize, a new bicycle, to Thompson for what was called a "major deed."

In 1960 Don Norberg of Pointe Claire, QC was injured slightly and taken to Maisonneuve Hospital after his car rolled over when struck by another vehicle.

== Venues ==
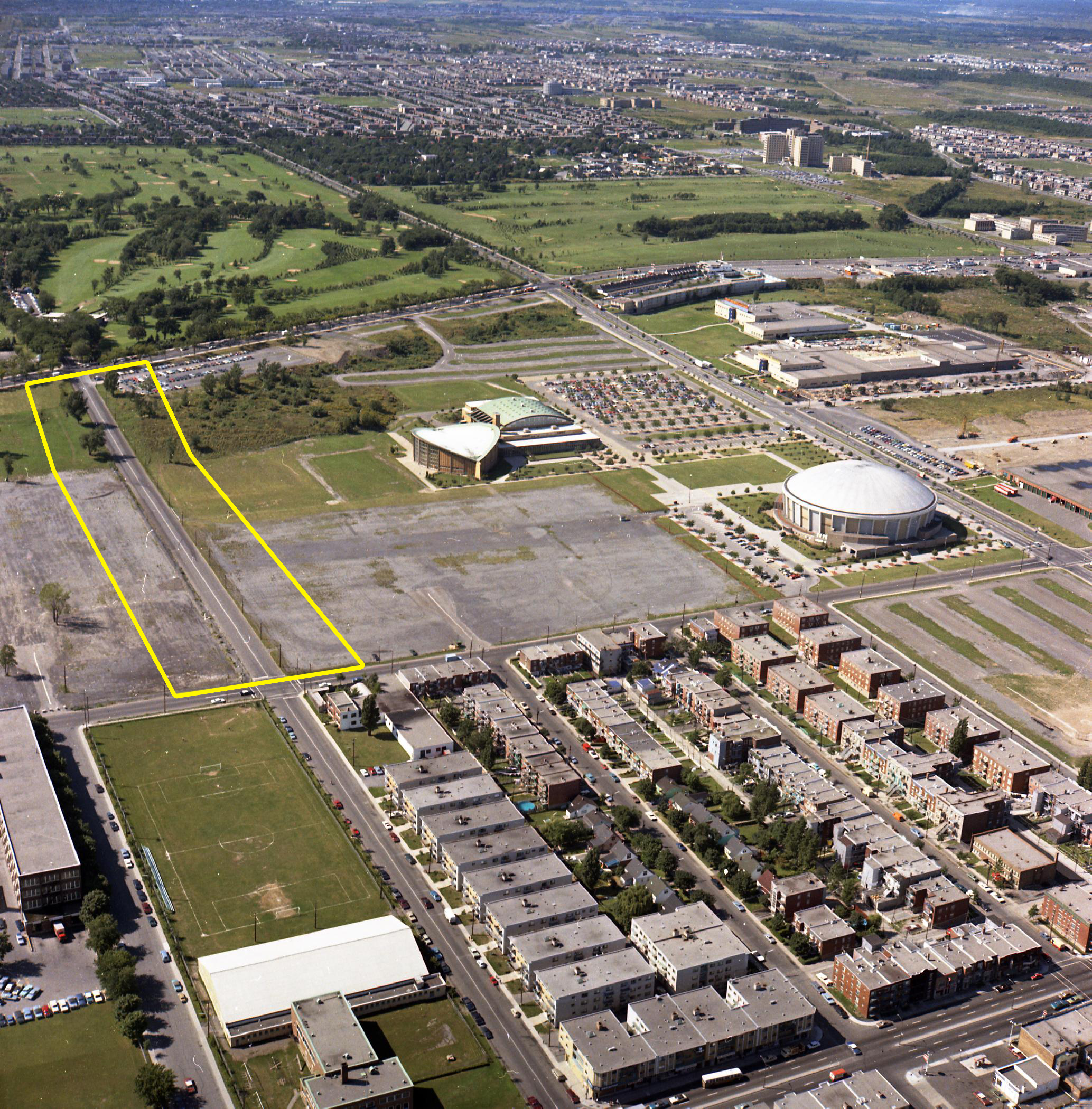
Montreal's east end in 1969, with the Maurice Richard Arena at center right. Highlighted is Aird Avenue, race venue from 1939 to 1940. Races returned in 1951, this time to Desjardins Avenue just a few blocks southwest (to the left, just outside of photo), viewed here.

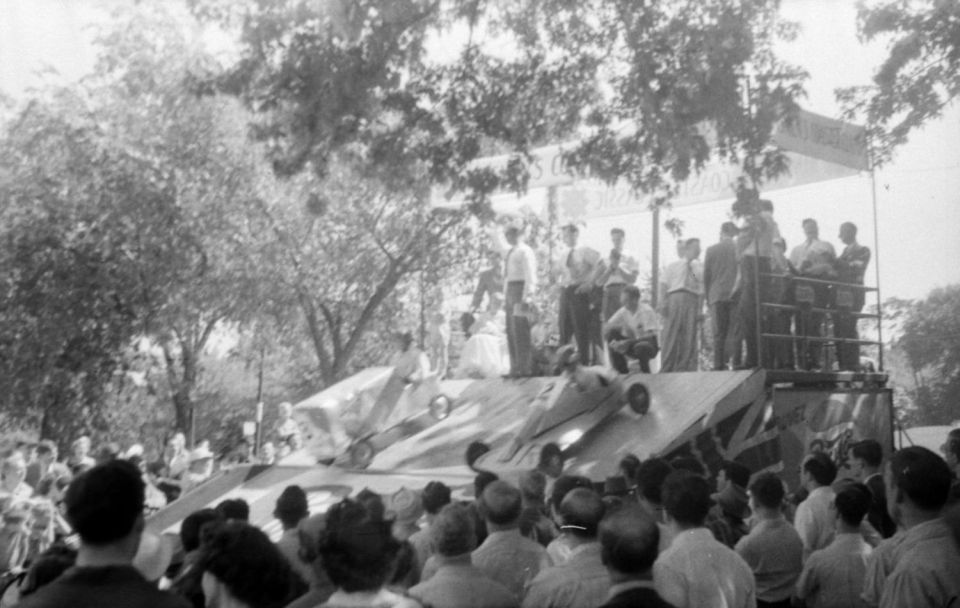
On the starting ramp at the 7th Kinsmen Coaster Classic, 1948

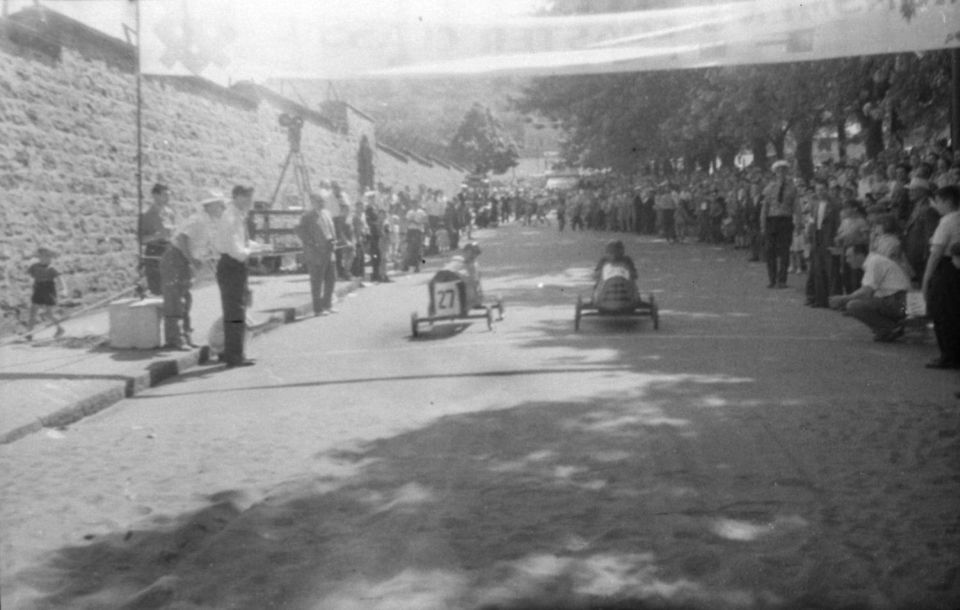
Racers hurdling down Duluth Ave, W. through Fletcher's Field, 1948

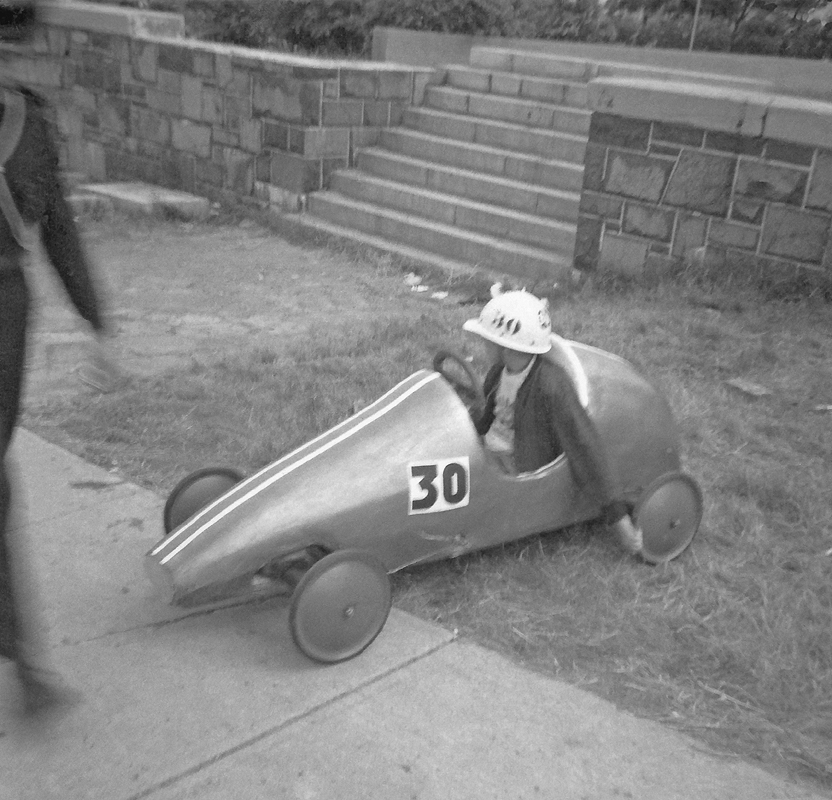
On Desjardins Avenue in 1967 is a racer awaiting a chance at victory

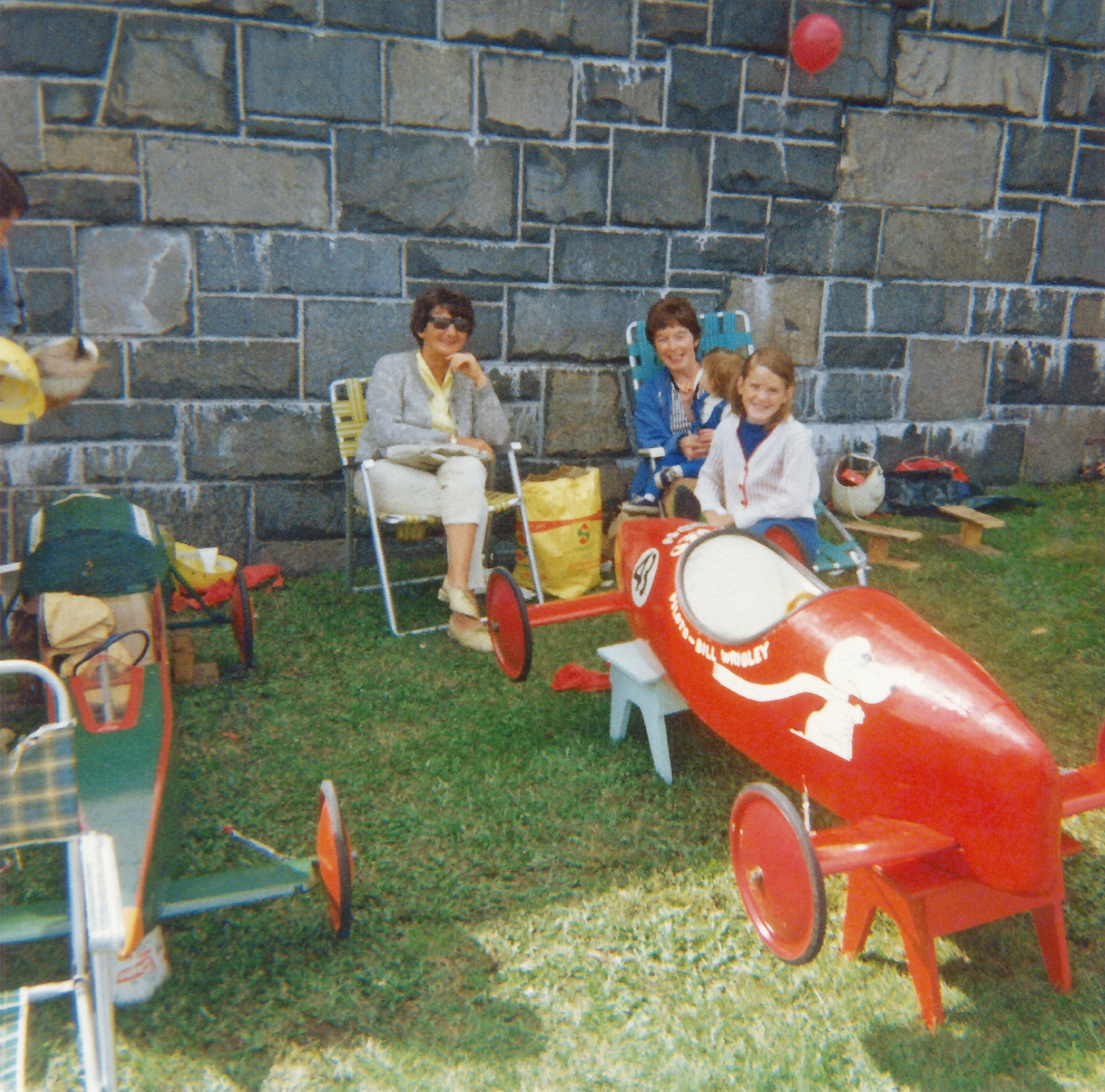
The 1969 Kinsmen Coaster Classic on Desjardins Ave. Peter Miller (green car) won the championship that day.

Locations for the Kinsmen Coaster Classic, which ran on city streets, varied across five separate venues during its lifetime. The inaugural race in 1938 took place on Van Horne Avenue (Note: 1st venue 45°29′38″N 73°38′17″W) between Victoria Avenue and Van Horne Park, chosen because it was well paved and free of houses along both sides of that corridor, allowing traffic to be closed off and spectators to gather safely. The next two years, races took place on an 1,100 foot track on Aird Avenue (Note: 2nd venue 45°33′37″N 73°33′11″W) in Montreal's east end neighborhood of Maisonneuve (pictured), between Sherbrooke St. E. and Boyce Street (now Pierre-de Coubertin Ave). Today the site is occupied by Montreal's Olympic Stadium, constructed in 1976. Aird was in a less developed neighborhood at the time with little traffic, ideal for races. In 1941 it moved back to Van Horne Avenue for one more year, then to the Trenholme Park neighborhood in the west Montreal neighborhood of NDG, remaining for two. Featuring a high starting ramp next to the park, (Note: 3rd venue 45°27′41″N 73°37′54″W) the cars headed southbound on Park Row East Road down a 600-foot course situated between Sherbrooke St. W and de Maisonneuve Blvd.

After cessation of hostilities in WWII the Kinsmen Coaster Classic resumed races in 1948, this time on picturesque Duluth Avenue West (Note: 4th venue 45°30′49″N 73°34′56″W) by Fletcher's Field between Park Avenue and Esplanade Avenue. Measuring approximately 525 feet in length, it was the shortest of the five venues, requiring a starting ramp that stood ten feet in height., and was used until 1950.

A permanent home

In 1951 a venue was selected on Desjardins Avenue, (Note: 5th venue 45°33′19″N 73°33′13″W) again in Montreal's east end neighborhood of Maisonneuve, nearby its Aird Avenue location eleven years earlier. Like Aird it was a quiet thoroughfare ideal for running races, measuring 865 feet in length, (Note: Measures out as approximately 865 feet according to Google Maps) with cars starting on a ramp at the top of the hill and crossing the finish 750 feet below where they were met by bales of hay if they could not stop in time. This was the Classic's last venue, becoming a permanent home for over twenty years.

The end

In 1973, construction began on Montreal's Olympic Park in preparation for the 1976 Summer Olympics, with the portion of Desjardins Avenue used for the race, between Sherbrooke St. E. and Boyce St., being redeveloped to accommodate the International Plaza, Pie-IX Station for Montreal's Metro subway, and underground parking accessed from Pie-IX Boulevard.

== Races ==
The table below lists the Kinsmen Coaster Classic race year, names of the champions and runners-up, their ages, hometown of champion, specific date when the race took place, number of entries that day, the race venue, and track length.

| Year | Champion's name | Age | Hometown | Car class | Runner-up's name | Age | Car class | Date of race | Cars entered | Venue, neighborhood | Track length |
|---|---|---|---|---|---|---|---|---|---|---|---|
| 1970 | | | | | | | | | | Desjardins Ave., Maisonneuve | 700–800 feet |
| 1969 | Peter Miller (pictured) | | Pointe Claire, QC | Official wheel | | | | 27 Sep | | Desjardins Ave., Maisonneuve | 700–800 feet |
| 1968 | | | | | | | | | | Desjardins Ave., Maisonneuve | 700–800 feet |
| 1967 | | | | | | | | | | Desjardins Ave., Maisonneuve | 700–800 feet |
| 1966 | | | | | | | | | | Desjardins Ave., Maisonneuve | 700–800 feet |
| 1965 | | | | | | | | | | Desjardins Ave., Maisonneuve | 700–800 feet |
| 1964 | | | | | | | | | | Desjardins Ave., Maisonneuve | 700–800 feet |
| 1963 | Alan Kitchen | 14 | Shawinigin-Falls, QC | Official wheel | Karl Hardy | | | 22 June | 41 | Desjardins Ave., Maisonneuve | 730 feet |
| 1962 | Tommy Moyle | | Shawinigin-Falls, QC | Official wheel | Ray MacDonald | | | 29 June | 50 | Desjardins Ave., Maisonneuve | 700–800 feet |
| 1961 | | | | | | | | | | Desjardins Ave., Maisonneuve | 700–800 feet |
| 1960 | Johnny Macmoyle | 12 | Shawinigin-Falls, QC | Official wheel | Anthony Chase | 14 | | 25 June | 57 | Desjardins Ave., Maisonneuve | 730 feet |
| 1959 | Michael Bourassa | 14 | Shawinigin-Falls, QC | Official wheel | | | | 20 June | 30+ | Desjardins Ave., Maisonneuve | 720 feet |
| 1958 | David Paige | 14 | Shawinigin-Falls, QC | Official wheel | Andrew Burnett | | unofficial wheel | 21 June | 36 | Desjardins Ave., Maisonneuve | 750 feet |
| 1957 | Fred Crowley | 13 | Montreal West, QC | Official wheel | | | | 22 June | 39 | Desjardins Ave., Maisonneuve | 1,025 feet (Note: The Montreal Gazette and Star reported a track length of 1,025 feet, which would be unlikely since the street is only 865 feet long) |
| 1956 | Tony Bush | 13 | Shawinigin-Falls, QC | Official wheel | Larry Butter | | unofficial wheel | 23 June | 60 | Desjardins Ave., Maisonneuve | 700–800 feet |
| 1955 | Norman Crutchfield | 14 | Shawinigin-Falls, QC | Official wheel | Charlie Large | | unofficial wheel | 25 June | 56 | Desjardins Ave., Maisonneuve | 723 feet |
| 1954 | Gordon Paige | 12 | Shawinigin-Falls, QC | Official wheel | Donald Kelly | | unofficial wheel | 26 June | 76 | Desjardins Ave., Maisonneuve | 720 feet |
| 1953 | Richard Powell | 14 | NDG | | Henry Kennedy | | | 27 June | 57 | Desjardins Ave., Maisonneuve | 900 feet (Note: The Montreal Star reported 300 yards.) |
| 1952 | Bob Jackson | 14 | Oshawa, ON | Ball bearing | Richard Powell | 13 | Ball bearing | 28 June | 98 | Desjardins Ave., Maisonneuve | 800 feet |
| 1951 | Richard Powell | 12 | NDG | Ball bearing | Simon Bush | 12 | Plain bearing | 16 June | 53 | Desjardins Ave., Maisonneuve | 700–800 feet |
| 1950 | Mervyn Roberts | 15 | Perth, ON | Ball bearing | Wayne Thompson | | Plain bearing | 17 June | | Duluth Ave. W., Fletcher's Field | 525 feet |
| 1949 | Tommy Patwell | 13 | Griffintown | Ball bearing | Francis Auclair | 15 | Plain bearing | 18 June | | Duluth Ave. W., Fletcher's Field | 525 feet |
| 1948 | Franz Gruninger | 13 | Trois-Rivières, QC | Ball bearing | Arthur de Beaumont | | Plain bearing | 26 June | 60 | Duluth Ave. W., Fletcher's Field | 525 feet |
| 1944-1947 | no races (Note: Like the Soap Box Derby in the US, which suspended its races from 1942 to 1945 during WWII, the Kinsmen Coaster Class followed suit for the same amount of time, only two years later.) | | | | | | | | | | |
| 1943 | Tommy Butters | 15 | Hampstead | Ball bearing | Dennis Brackley | | Plain bearing | 10 July | 10 (Note: Lowest turnout at the Classic, due to the War) | Trenholme Pk., NDG in Montreal | 600 feet |
| 1942 | Tommy Butters | 14 | Hampstead | class A | Monty Weedon | | | 20 June | | Trenholme Pk., NDG in Montreal | 600 feet |
| 1941 | Tommy Butters | 13 | Hampstead | class A | Robert Deslaurier | | class B | 20 Sept | 35 | Van Horne Avenue, Côte-Des-Neiges | 1,100 feet |
| 1940 | Bill Colyer | | Westmount | class A | Tommy Butters | 12 | class B | 22 June | 100+ | Aird Avenue, Maisonneuve | 1,100 feet |
| 1939 | Sydney Wright, | 14 | Verdun | class A | Gus Mell | 12 | class B | 22 Sept | 50 | Aird Avenue, Maisonneuve | 1,100 feet |
| 1938 | Bill Telfer, | 11 | Hampstead | class B | Leonard Applebaum | 14 | class A | 8 Oct | 56 | Van Horne Avenue, Côte-Des-Neiges | 1,100 feet |

== Cars ==
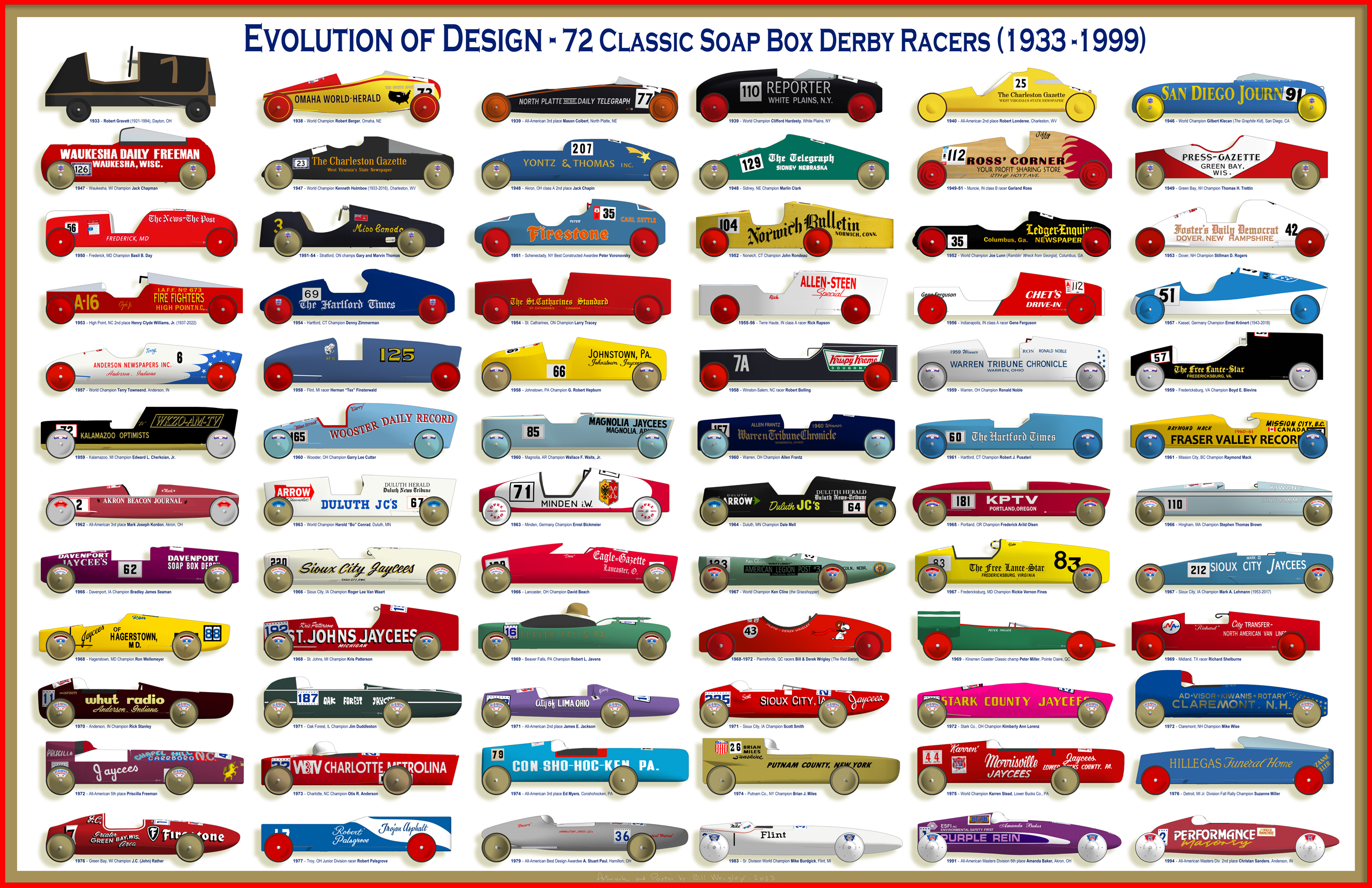
Evolution of Design - Profiles of 72 classic Soap Box Derby racers (to scale) from 1933 to 1994. 65 of the cars competed in American Derby races at local and World Championship levels, two in Germany and five in Canada, including two at the Kinsmen Coaster Classic, found in the lower right quadrant

Boys that participated in the Kinsmen Coaster Class habitually gave their cars catchy names, like "Jake's Crate", piloted in 1952 by Gerry Sawdon of Perth, Ontario, "Butch's Bullet", "Will E. Win," and "Slo-Mo-Shun." Cars boasting of speed had names like "Silver Bullet" from 1938 (pictured above), "Cloud of Dust" and "Speed Demon," both from 1959. There was of course Bill Telfer's "Thunderbolt", Tony Bush's 1956 champ car "Sky Rocket," Johnny MacMoyle's 1960 champ car "Swift One," and Richard Powell's 1953 champ car "Winged Arrow," which was really about driving one's car "as straight as an arrow" in order to win. Historical names included "Citation", Franz Gruninger's 1948 champ car named after the champion American Thoroughbred, "Rocket Richard," after Montreal's beloved 'Rocket' Richard, and "The Red Baron", of the famed WWI flying ace, on cars painted red. One car made of miscellaneous scraps of wood was called, simply enough, "Miscellaneous."

The images below represent cars from both ends of the Kinsmen Coaster Classic's history, two from 1938 and two from the late sixties.

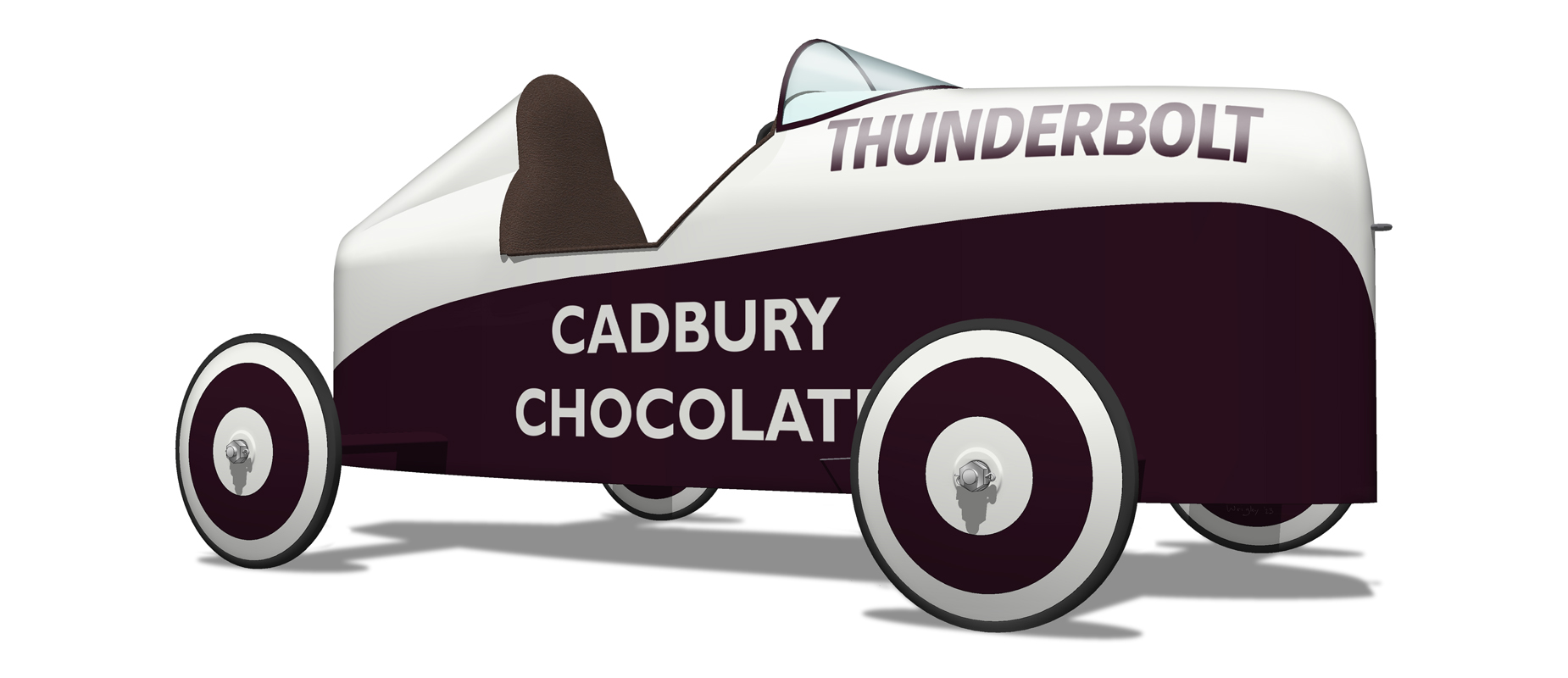
Kinsmen Coaster Classic Champion Bill Telfer's "Thunderbolt" race car from 1938. Sponsored by Cadbury, it comprised a headrest, windscreen (Note: Windscreens were dropped in 1948 according to Official Derby rules.) and modern wheels.

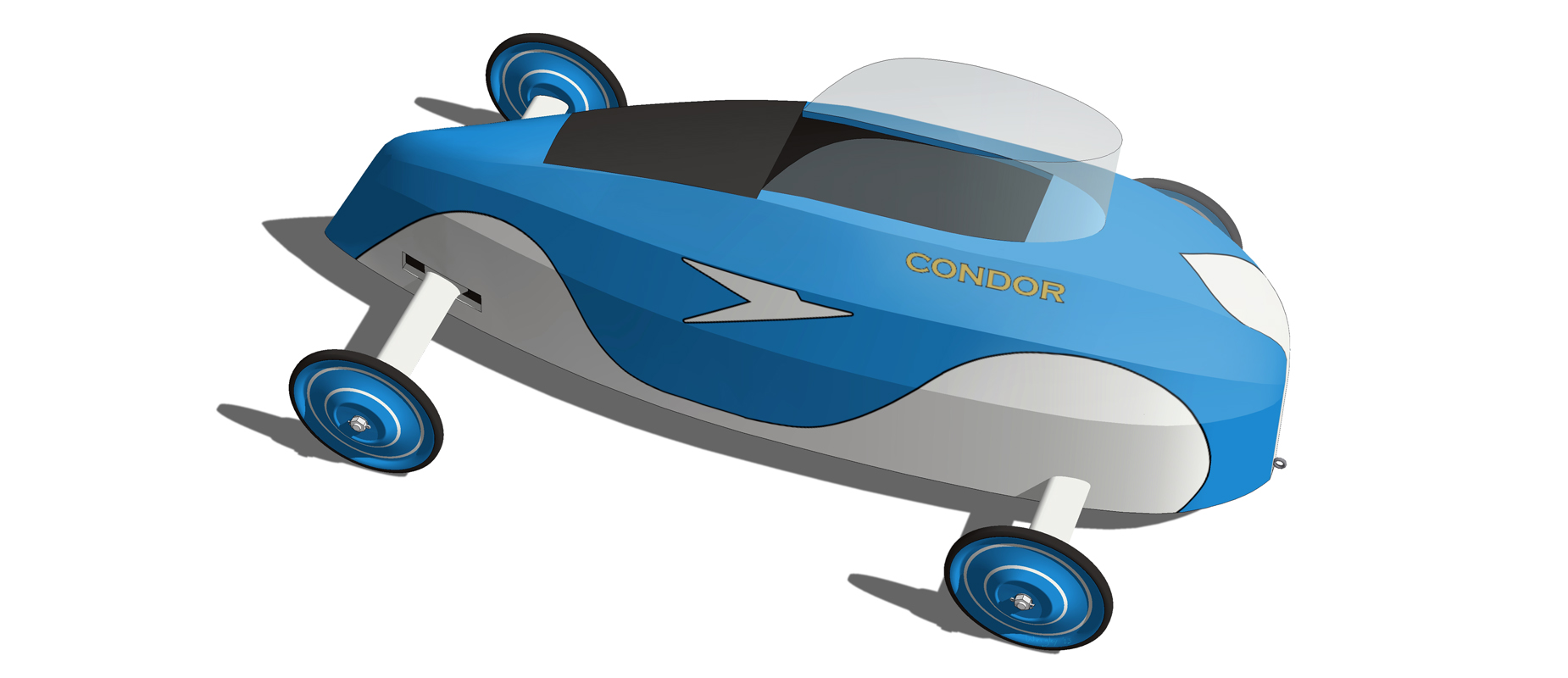
1938 Kinsmen Coaster Classic Best Looking Car Award winner Hans Gruninger. Named "Condor," it featured the nascent Speedbird logo for Britain's Imperial Airways, later BOAC.

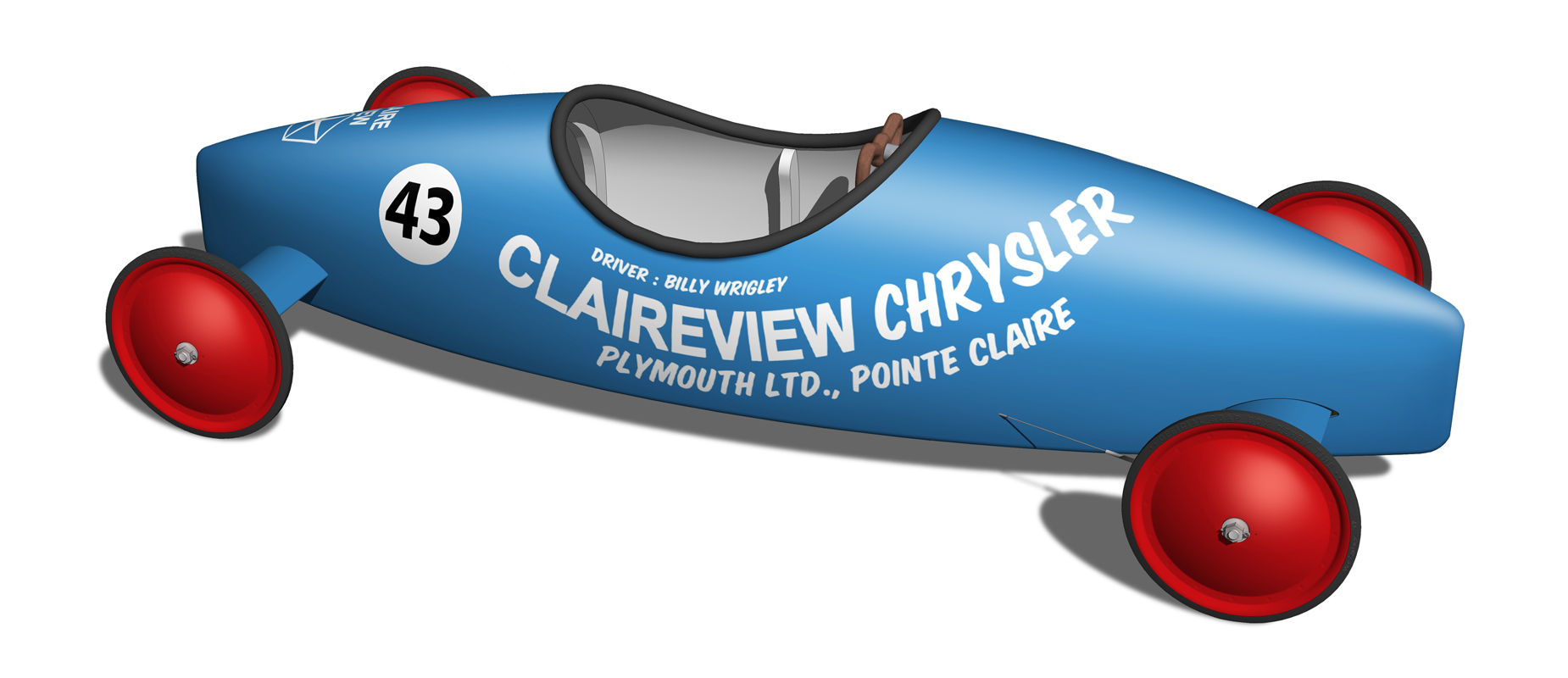
Tom Taylor Memorial Trophy winner for best-constructed car in 1967 was this entry sponsored by Claireview Chrysler and Plymouth Ltd. of Pointe Claire, QC

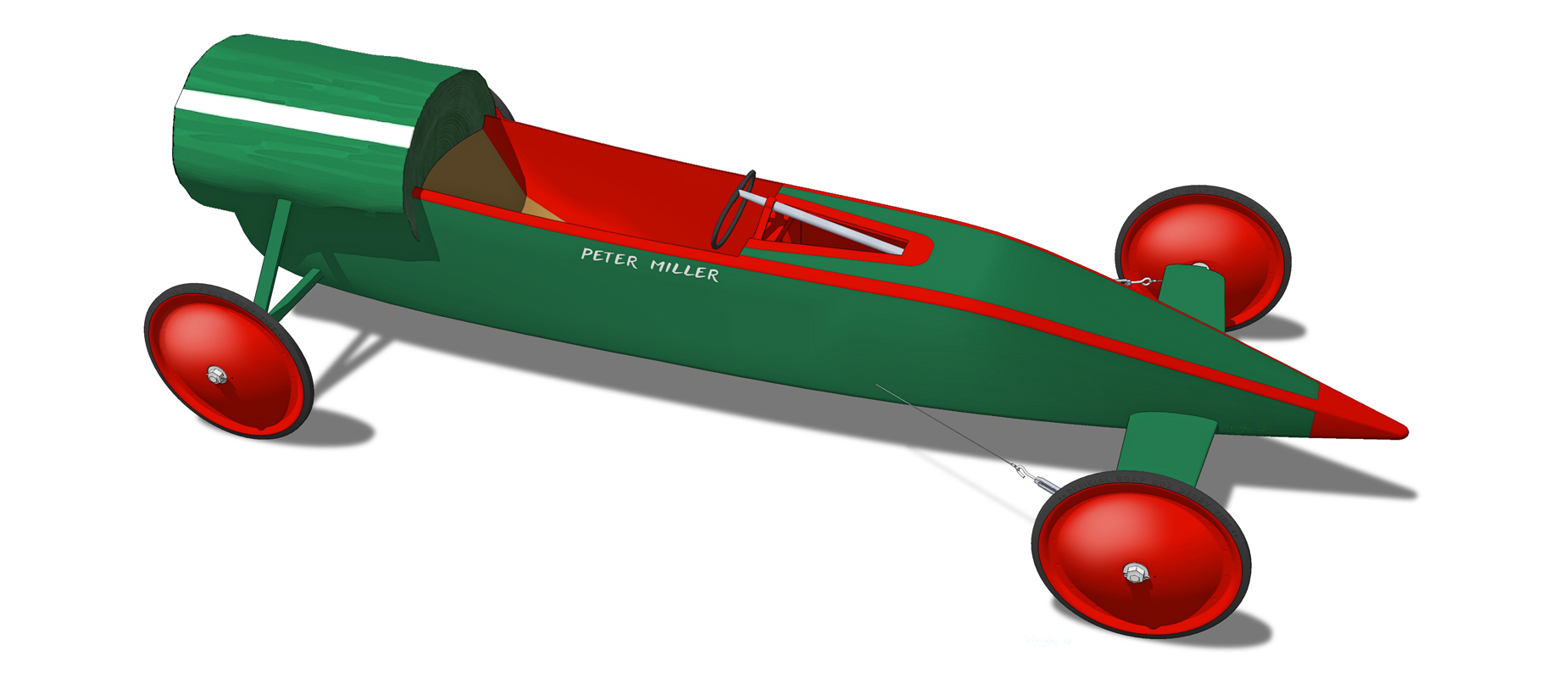
A new-generation lay-down racer piloted by Peter Miller, who won the 1969 championship. In the Pierrefonds, Quebec inaugural soap box derby in 1968, Miller won the class A race.

== Notes, citations and sources ==
Notes

Citations

Books

- Rosenthal, Sylvia A. (1980). Soap Box Derby Racing (1st ed.). Lorthop, Lee & Shepard Books. ISBN 978-0688519155.
- Payne, Melanie (2003). Champions, Cheaters, and Childhood Dreams: Memories of the Soap Box Derby (1st ed.). University of Akron Press. ISBN 978-1935603481. LCCN 2003008689.
- Iula, Jeff; Ignizio, Bill (2011). How I Saw It: My Photographic Memory of the Soap Box Derby (1st ed.). University of Akron Press. ISBN 978-1935603078.

News

- "South African Soap Box Racer to Compete in National Event". Scranton Republican. 16 Jul 1936. p. 4 – via Newspaper.com. "Norman Neumann, Pretoria, South Africa, will compete in the National Soap Box Derby at Akron, Ohio."
- "'Scottie' Father of Derby". Akron Beacon Journal. 15 Aug 1936. p. 34 – via Newspaper.com. "Conceived Idea Of Soap Box Race While Hunting Photos As Newspaperman"
- "Belleville Lad, 12, Draws No. 13, Wins Soap Box Derby". The Toronto Star. 11 Aug 1937. p. 15 – via Newspaper.com. "Lawnmower-Wheeled Chariot Wins Youth Entry in Inter-national Classic"
- "Here Are Derby Contestants". Akron Beacon Journal. 13 Aug 1937. p. 14 – via Newspaper.com. "boys taking part in the All-American ang International Soap Box Derby at Derby Downs Sunday"
- "Boys Make Own Cars for Soap Box Derby". The Montreal Star. 22 Aug 1938. p. 4 – via Newspaper.com. "Baby - Buggy Wheels Sought to Supply Demand"
- "Soap-Box Derby Entrants Try Out on Secret Course". The Montreal Star. 27 Aug 1938. p. 3 – via Newspaper.com. "Contestants Warned Not to Practice on Streets With-out Permission On Pain of Disqualification"
- "Soap Box Derby is Planned Here To Aid Campaign for Eye Clinic". The Gazette. 24 Aug 1938. p. 4 – via Newspaper.com. "funds for the new clinic are being raised by having individuals and companies interested in the welfare of under-privileged children sponsor boy-made cars in the race."
- "400 Now Enrolled For Soap-Box Race". The Gazette. 5 Sep 1938. p. 4 – via Newspaper.com. "cars already finished are going to be disqualified when they come to be inspected"
- "Coaster Derby Route Chosen by Kinsmen". The Montreal Star. 5 Oct 1938. p. 3 – via Newspaper.com. "The street is well paved and free of houses on both sides, making it easy to close to traffic and giving sufficient room for spectators and to park automobiles."
- "Billy Telfer, 11 Wins First Soap Box Derby". The Montreal Star. 10 Oct 1938. p. 4 & 9 – via Newspaper.com. "Young Speedster Captures Title of Provincial Coaster Champion Before Crowd of 4,000 Spectators"
- "11-Year-Old Hampton Youth Wins First Local Soap Box Derby". The Gazette. 10 Oct 1938. p. 13 – via Newspaper.com. "Billy Telfer Hits 30 M.P.H in "Thunderbolt" to Defeat 80 Rivals"
- "See the Prize Winning Cars". The Montreal Star. 11 Oct 1938. p. 33 – via Newspaper.com.
- "S. Wright, 14-year old Verdunite, Wins Soap-Box Race In Field of 50". The Gazette. 2 Oct 1939. p. 13 – via Newspaper.com.
- "More Prizes Offered". The Gazette. 13 Jun 1940. p. 9 – via Newspaper.com. "Third annual event in this city, the coaster classic is to be run this year June 22 on Aird avenue, Montreal East."
- "Westmount Boy Wins Coaster Event". The Gazette. 24 Jun 1940. p. 11 – via Newspaper.com. "Tommy Butters, runner-up for the grand award and champion of the "B" section of the classic."
- "T. Butters Winner in Soapbox Derby". The Gazette. 22 Sep 1941. p. 13 & 14 – via Newspaper.com. "fourth annual Kinsmen Coaster Classic, held before a crowd of 5,000 on Van Horne avenue between Decarie boulevard and Cotes des Neiges road."
- Mcheil, Marc T. (10 Jun 1942). "Coasters Go Rolling By". The Gazette. p. 16 – via Newspaper.com. "The Kinsmen's event is not following suit and shutting up shop for the war."
- "Tommy Butters Beats Out Brother". The Gazette. 22 Jun 1942. p. 13 – via Newspaper.com. "Tommy Butters took second place for the best constructed coaster"
- "Kinsmen Hold Coaster Derby". The Gazette. July 12, 1943. p. 24 – via Newspaper.com. "Butters clocked the 200-yard Trenholme Hill in 19%½ seconds."
- "Tommy Butters Wins 3rd Coaster Event". The Gazette. 12 Jul 1943. p. 13 – via Newspaper.com. "Speeds Down 200 Yard Trenhole Park Course in Just Under Twenty Seconds"
- "Citation Beats Field of 60 Entries". The Gazette. 28 Jun 1948. p. 7 – via Newspaper.com. "Gruninger was awarded the Birks Trophy"
- "Coaster Classic Champs". The Montreal Star. 28 Jun 1948. p. 28 – via Newspaper.com. "annual Kinsmen Coaster Classic on Fletcher Field Saturday."
- "Franz Gruninger Wins Kinsman Coaster Classic". The St. Maurice Valley Chronicle. Vol. XXX, no. 38. 1 Jul 1948. p. 1 – via Google Books. "First Three Rivers Youngster To Win Montreal Event"
- Croll, Bruce (20 Jun 1949). "Annual Kinsmen Coaster Classic Won by Tommy Patwell, Griffintown". The Gazette. p. 3 – via Newspaper.com. "steered down the 175-yard course on Fletcher's Field in 18⅜ seconds to capture the Kinsmen Coaster Classic of 1949"
- "Everything Homemade Except Wheels". The Gazette. 19 June 1950. p. 13 – via Newspaper.com. "Standard Trophy for the best-constructed car (won last year by Mervyn Roberts)"
- "Winning Drivers in Derby". The Gazette. 18 Jun 1951. p. 15 – via Newspaper.com. "More than 700 persons witnessed the event in which 53 young racing enthusiasts vied for honors."
- "All-Canadian Coaster Classic Interest High". The Montreal Star. 14 Mar 1952. p. 18 – via Newspaper.com. "They have come from British Columbia, Newfoundland, Ontario, New Brunswick, and from several places in Quebec."
- "Coaster Classic Set". The Montreal Star. 6 Jun 1952. p. 18 – via Newspaper.com.
- "116 Youngsters Tune Up 'Hot Rods'". The Gazette. 10 Jun 1952. p. 33 – via Newspaper.com. "entered "soapbox" cars in the "All-Canadian Coaster Classic" sponsored by Montreal Kinsmen Club June 28 on Desjardins street."
- "Schoolboy Speedster Wins Coaster Classic Cup, Twice". The Gazette. 30 Jun 1952. p. 13 – via Newspaper.com. "Unlike the winner. most boys dubbed their cars with catchy names."
- "Oshawa Boy Takes Trophy". The Montreal Star. 28 Jun 1952. p. 3 – via Newspaper.com. "A great pile of straw across the bottom of the street protected the drivers when their fast-moving little vehicles reached the end of the course."
- "Coaster Winner Donates Prize To Boy Injured in Race". The Montreal Star. 30 Jun 1952. p. 4 – via Newspaper.com. "Miniature Event, Major Deed"
- "Oshawa Lad Wins Soapbox Derby". Daily Standard-Freeholder. 30 Jun 1952. p. 5 – via Newspaper.com. "voluntarily crashed his car, breaking both in-steps, in an effort to avoid a heed-less youngster"
- "Perth Lad Places Third In Big Race". The Kingston Whig-Standard. 4 Jul 1952. p. 5 – via Newspaper.com. "only representative from Perth and raced his "Jakes Crate" down the 800 foot ramp in 24 seconds."
- "Missed Crown Once - Youngster Wins Classic". The Montreal Star. 27 Jun 1953. p. 3 – via Newspaper.com. "home-built coaster across the finish line on Desjardins street and thereby won the all-Canada coaster classic crown a crown"
- "'Keep 'Er Straight,' Says Lad". The Gazette. 29 Jun 1953. p. 3 – via Newspaper.com. "He received his fifth bicycle for winning races Saturday"
- "'Potato Bug' Paige Heads Hodge-Podge of Hot Rods". The Gazette. 28 Jun 1954. p. 12 – via Newspaper.com. "down the 720-foot course."
- "Shawinigan Boy Wins Coaster Race". The Gazette. 27 Jun 1955. p. 35 – via Newspaper.com. "down the 723-foot speedway."
- "Young Shawinigan Enthusiasts Win Soap Box Racing Classic". The Gazette. 25 Jun 1956. p. 3 – via Newspaper.com. "The event, on Desjardins St., just south of Sherbrooke St., attracted about 2,000 spectators and 60 entrants"
- "He Coasted to Victory". The Montreal Star. 24 Jun 1957. p. 2 – via Newspaper.com. "along a 1,025-foot track. Thirty-nine boys from all parts of the island took part in the event at Desjardins and Sherbrooke streets."
- "Montreal West Youth Wins Soapbox Race". The Gazette. 25 Jun 1957. p. 4 – via Newspaper.com. "The winner is awarded the Birks Trophy and a new bicycle."
- "Akron Hailed at Banquet". Akron Beacon Journal. 19 Aug 1957. p. 19 – via Newspaper.com. "Third-Andy Vasko. St.Catharines, Ont., Canada: $3.000 college scholarship and third place trophy."
- "Homemade Racing Cars 'Burn Up' Track". The Montreal Star. 25 Jun 1958. p. 4 – via Newspaper.com. "Thirty-six junior size racing cars gathered at Desjardins street"
- "Shawinigan Boy Wins Soap Box Race Classic". The Gazette. 23 Jun 1958. p. 3 – via Newspaper.com. "750-foot run"
- "Shawinigan Boy Takes Coaster Classic Prizes". The Montreal Star. 22 Jun 1959. p. 3 – via Newspaper.com. "720-foot incline on Desjardins street...bore such names as Will E. Win, Rocket Richard, Cloud of Dust and Speed Demon."
- "Kiss Tough For Winner". The Gazette. 27 Jun 1960. p. 9 – via Newspaper.com. "fifth consecutive year a boy from Shawinigan"
- "'Swift One' Swiftest in Coaster Classic". The Montreal Star. 27 Jun 1960. p. 2 – via Newspaper.com. "Don Norberg of Pointe Claire was slightly injured and taken to Maisonneuve Hospital when his car was struck by another vehicle and turned over."
- "Tommy Moyle se Signale à Montréal". L'Echo du St-Maurice. 2 Oct 1962. p. 12.
- "Shawinigan Boy Leader in Coasters". The Montreal Star. 24 Jun 1963. p. 21 – via Newspaper.com. "He barrelled (sic) down the 750 yard incline"
- "Shawinigan Boy Is Victorious In Kinsmen Coaster Classic". The Gazette. 24 Jun 1963. p. 3 – via Google Books. "Alan Kitchen, 14, of Shawinigan raced his "soapbox," Sleek Streak II, down Desjardins St."
- "Pierrefonds Lad Wins "Best Car" in Kinsmen Soap Box Derby". The North Shore News. Vol. V, no. 43. 22 Jun 1967. p. 10 – via Google Books. "The local boy won the Tom Taylor Memorial Trophy and a transistor radio."
- "Pierrefonds' First Annual Soap Box Derby Pronounced "Huge Success"". The North Shore News. Vol. VII, no. 5. 26 Sep 1968. p. 3 – via Google Books. "Valois' Peter Miller Captures "A" Title"
- "Coaster classic set for Sept. 27". The Gazette. 4 Sep 1969. p. 46 – via Newspaper.com. "The Montreal Kinsmen Club "All Canadian Coaster Classic""

Websites

- "Photo". City of Montreal.
- "Soap Box Derby history". Soap Box Derby.
- "1976 Olympic Park Map". Architecture of the Games.
- "L'époque des courses de boîtes à savon". Ici Radio Canada.
- Bouchard-Dupont, Maude. "100 ans de sports et loisirs à Maisonneuve". City of Montreal.
- "Classic Soap Box Derby Racers (1933-1999)". Sketchup 3D Warehouse.
