= The Great Holyoke Brick Race =

The Great Holyoke Brick Race is a gravity race involving brick racers that takes place annually on Race Street in Holyoke, Massachusetts. Brick racers are vehicles which must incorporate a standard brick in their construction and travel free of mechanical help in their course down a custom concrete track. The race is the first and only brick race in existence.

The Great Holyoke Brick Race emphasizes fun, creativity and the sculptural quality of the race cars as well as speed. The organizers have described it as "performance art meets sport." Custom trophies are given each year for the fastest racer. In the past, awards have also been given for the categories of Best Crash and Most Creative. Notable designs from past years include the Empire State Building, complete with King Kong on top, and a brick that was encased in a block of ice that bounced and rolled down the track. Since the first Brick Race in 2011, over 350 contestants and more than 1,000 spectators of all ages have taken part.

The race was conceived and created by artists Bruce Fowler and Dean Nimmer in November 2010, to highlight a growing local art scene. The first race took place in 2011, with annual races taking place since then. The 100 foot concrete track was built by artist Micheal Karmody. Fowler and Nimmer were inspired by the power tool racing events occurring in creative communities such as San Francisco, CA and Portland, OR, as well as the coincidence that the street where their studios were located was named Race Street.

The event is supported in part by a grant from the Holyoke Cultural Council, a local agency which is supported by the Massachusetts Cultural Council, a state agency.
