= Pushcart derby =

Jamaican cart race

The pushcart derby is a popular sporting event held every August in Jamaica wherein homemade carts used for street vending or to transport items take part in races, similar to soapbox races. The pushcart derby in Jamaica is credited as the inspiration for the Jamaica national bobsleigh team.

Pushcart derby had been a popular hobby among youth for quite some time, but was first organized into a competitive event in Discovery Bay, Jamaica in 1975. The event was organized by Con Pink, the community relations supervisor of a bauxite mining company called Kaiser. The event was organized to further community relations between Kaiser and the Jamaican populace. The event became a popular tradition, with over 100 Kaiser employees on the organizing committee. Teams from each of the fourteen parishes of Jamaica participate in the event.

In 1987, two American businessmen named George Fitch and William Maloney observed the pushcart derby and thought that it looked similar to bobsleigh. The Americans collaborated with the Jamaica Olympic Association to recruit Jamaican track athletes as well as soldiers from the Jamaica Defence Force to create the Jamaica national bobsleigh team. The team was funded by George Fitch and the Jamaican Tourism Board. The team made their debut at the 1988 Winter Olympics. Additionally, the women's team made their Olympic debut at the 2018 Winter Olympics. The connection to pushcart derby and the debut of Jamaica at the Winter Olympics inspired the 1993 film Cool Runnings, although the events of the film are heavily fictionalized.

The Jamaican pushcart derby event was discontinued in 2000, but was reinstated in 2016. The sport's reintroduction was organized by Evon Williams.

== See also ==
- Sport in Jamaica
