= Catterline Cartie Challenge =

The Black Pig taking part in the 2007 Catterline Cartie Challenge

The Catterline Cartie Challenge is a competition for homemade soapbox carts (or "carties", as they are known locally) held annually in Catterline, near Stonehaven, Scotland. It is part of the Catterline Gala Weekend and is held annually on the second weekend in June , with the carties being displayed at the gala on the Saturday and then time-trialed down the brae from the Creel Inn to the harbour the following day.

It was first held on 11/12 June 2005, when 11 carties were entered. The number of entries has grown in subsequent years, and in 2008 there were 26 carties taking part.

Prizes are awarded for the single fastest run (The Connons Shield), fastest aggregate time (Constructors Championship), Best Engineered, Best Decorated, Champagne Moment, Furthest Travelled, Cartie Sprint and "The Great Catterline Cartie Race".

The course is almost exactly 1000 ft (304.8m) long with a drop of almost 100 ft (30.5m) from start to finish, and the carties can reach speeds of around 30 mph at the finish line. As a result, the construction rules require the carties to have adequate brakes and steering. Other than these safety considerations, however, there are very few restrictions on the size and shape of the carties, and as a consequence there tends to be a wide range of designs entered, with many teams eschewing pure speed in favour of colourful novelty carties. These carties are very popular with the spectators and are often more memorable than the eventual winners.

== Winners ==
=== 2009 ===
==== Connons Shield ====
1st. The Cheats / Tequilla Slammer
2nd. A La Cartie / The Auld Alliance
3rd. Bervie Allstars / The Bervie Bomber

==== Constructors Trophy ====
1st. The Cheats / Tequilla Slammer
2nd. Bitter and Twisted / Once a Fortnight
3rd. Team Weasel / The Flying Ferret

=== 2008 ===
==== Connons Shield ====
1st. A La Cartie / The Auld Alliance
2nd. Firstdrive Cars / The Bandit
3rd. Team Riley / The Black Bomber

==== Constructors Trophy ====
1st. Bitter and Twisted / Once a Fortnight
2nd. Firstdrive Cars / The Bandit
3rd. A La Cartie / The Auld Alliance

=== 2007 ===
==== Connons Shield ====
1st. Chariots of Fire / Elijah
2nd. The Cheats / Tequilla Slammer
3rd. Firstdrive B / The Bandit

==== Constructors Trophy ====
1st. Bitter and Twisted / Once a Fortnight
2nd. Firstdrive Cars / The Bandit
3rd. Tequila Slammer MkIII / The Cheats

=== 2006 ===
==== Connons Shield ====
1st. Bitter and Twisted / Once a Fortnight
2nd. A La Cartie / The Auld Alliance
3rd. The Cheats / Tequila Slammer

==== Constructors Trophy ====
1st. The Cheats / Tequila Slammer
2nd. Firstdrive Cars / The Bandit
3rd. The Dragster / Checkpoint Racing

=== 2005 ===
==== Connons Shield ====
1st. Chariots of Fire / Elijah
2nd. Team Scozzie / Creel Runnings
3rd. The Cheats / Tequilla Slammer
