= Billy cart =

Type of motorless vehicle

A billy cart is a popular Australian form of gravity powered vehicle, often homemade and constructed for either recreational or competitive use. The name of the cart tends to vary regionally, with synonyms "go cart" and "hill trolley".

== History ==
=== 1880s–1890s ===
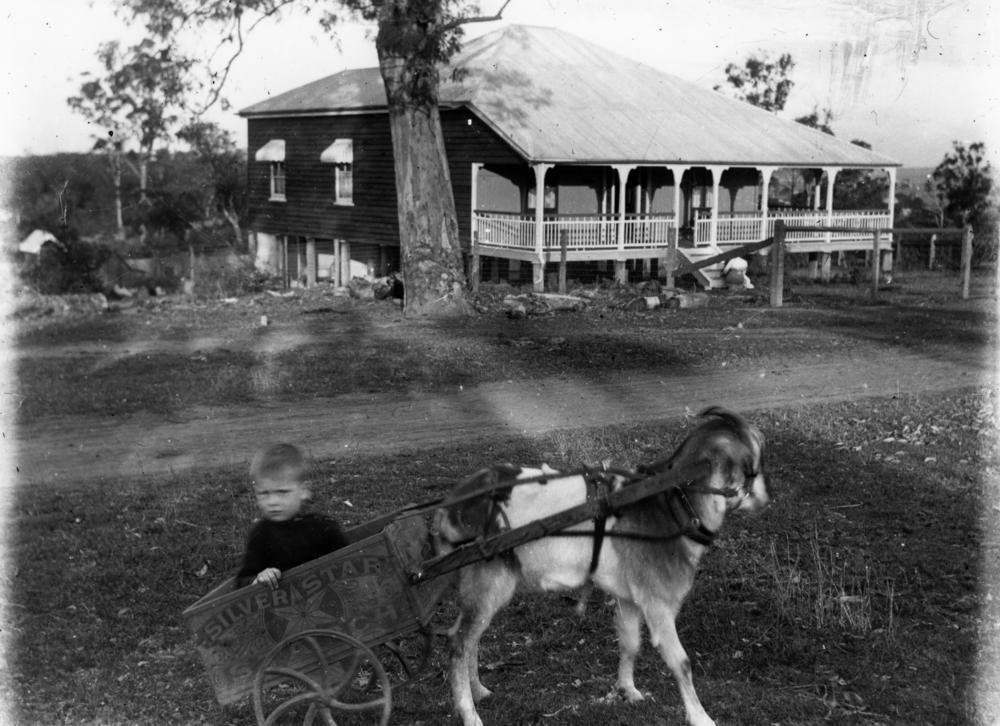
Young boy in a billy cart outside a Queenslander home at Indooroopilly, Brisbane c. 1910

The first references to billy carts appear in the 1880s, with the term identified as originating from wooden carts pulled by billygoats, with these carts being a commonplace occurrence throughout Australia prior to the emergence of the automobile.

These carts were adapted over time to become both a tool and toy for children, featuring a design comprising primarily timber materials with four wheels and a front steering system which utilised a pivoting axle design. Rope was then attached to this pivoting axle to enable the cart to be pulled or steered by hand. This design was advantageous for kids who would scavenge areas for food, scrap materials and more, whilst also becoming a pastime wherein children would challenge others to see who could travel the fastest/furthest with gravity to assist in building momentum.

=== 1900s–1950s ===
The early to mid 1900s are considered to be the time in which billy carts were most popular, as most Australians had become aware of the carts and due to the low cost and simple design were easy to construct. Many such examples were constructed either from scrap timber/offcuts or from wooden crates which had been used to transport goods such as produce. During World War II, billy carts were utilised by children tasked with collecting waste from the community as part of the war effort.

As automobiles rose to prevalence during this time there was an increase in incidents involving billy carts identified, this can be attributed to the fact that impromptu races organised by neighbourhood children were often run on the same roads as vehicles, without road closures, and as car ownership grew in suburban areas of Australia the risk of colliding with vehicles grew.

In 1952, seeking to aid his son's lawnmowing business, Mervyn Victor Richardson created a prototype lawnmower, utilising scrap metal and recycled household items, including wheels from a billy cart. Following the successful prototype Richardson created the Victa Mowers company, producing lawnmowers which quickly became an Australian icon.

=== 1960s–1990s ===
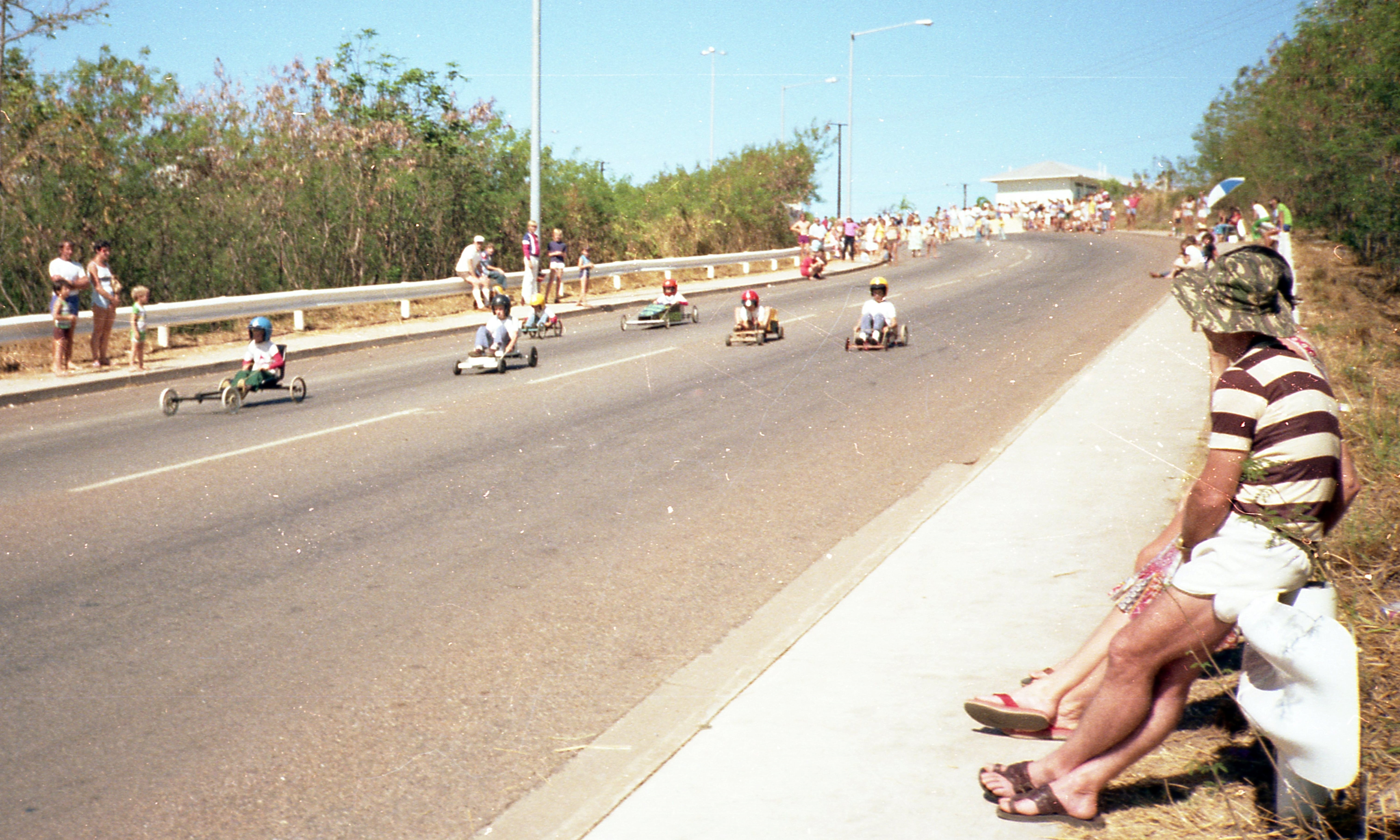
Billycart Grand Prix, Darwin, c. 1978

The mid to late 1900s were seen to bring on the rise of organised competitions. This can be linked to the nostalgia of parents and grandparents who built their carts in the decades prior recognising the value of play and building cart to providing the same opportunity for their children. The immense popularity of Soapbox Racing in the United States is also likely to have encouraged race organisers in Australia.

During this time some competitive carts could be seen to adopt similar design cues to the American Soapbox, with an aerodynamic streamlined design, lay-down configuration and front pivot axle steering which was aided by a steering wheel to improve safety and control of the cart at higher speeds.

The more traditional cart style however remained a staple of recreational use, used by children living in suburbs either on grassed hills or streets with low volumes of vehicle traffic. This cart style was also often used competitively as the simple and low-cost design enabled them to be built by children with minimal assistance from adults, allowing for unofficial competition and collaboration to occur between children within a community. Billy cart derbies were often utilised during this time as popular community events, aimed at creating a rich environment of community participation and also further benefit as a fundraising opportunity.

In 1981, The Perth Soapbox Club (founded 1968) was successful in securing a location for a dedicated race track, located in the Western Australia Sporting Car Club complex. Following its construction it remains today as the only dedicated facility/track in Australia for billy cart racing.

The WinterSun Carnival held in Tweed Heads and Coolangatta hosted annual billy cart races as part of the event program which were organised by the Tweed Heads/Gold Coast Billy Cart Association, with the 1984 'WinterSun National Supercart Derby' attracting American soapbox derby champions from Amarillo Texas to compete against local entrants.

=== 2000s–2020s ===
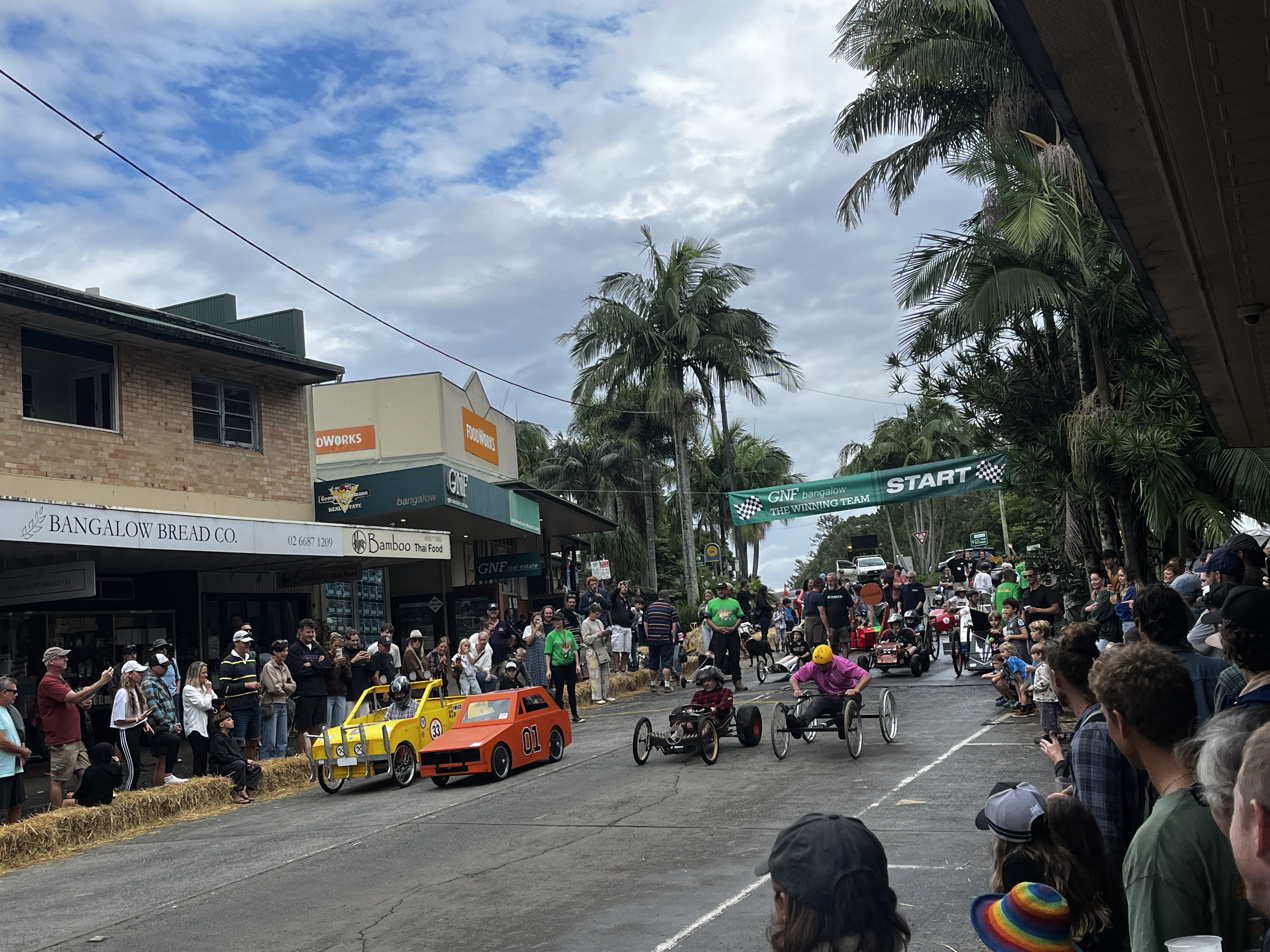
Billycarts at the top of the hill at the 2025 Bangalow Billycart Derby

Whilst the popularity of billy carts as a competitive sport has declined from the mid-late 1900s there remains a dedicated number of groups which organise annual derbys as a community event. Similarly, there is a large following of the sport, with a significant online and social media presence, particularly as corporations such as Redbull have developed billy cart races into a popular form of online content, creating strong links between entertainment, community experience and a recognisable sporting brand identity. The recreational appeal of billy carts has also remained relevant, with research reaffirming the social and health benefits associated with activities such as building and using billy carts in the backyard, local streets and parks.

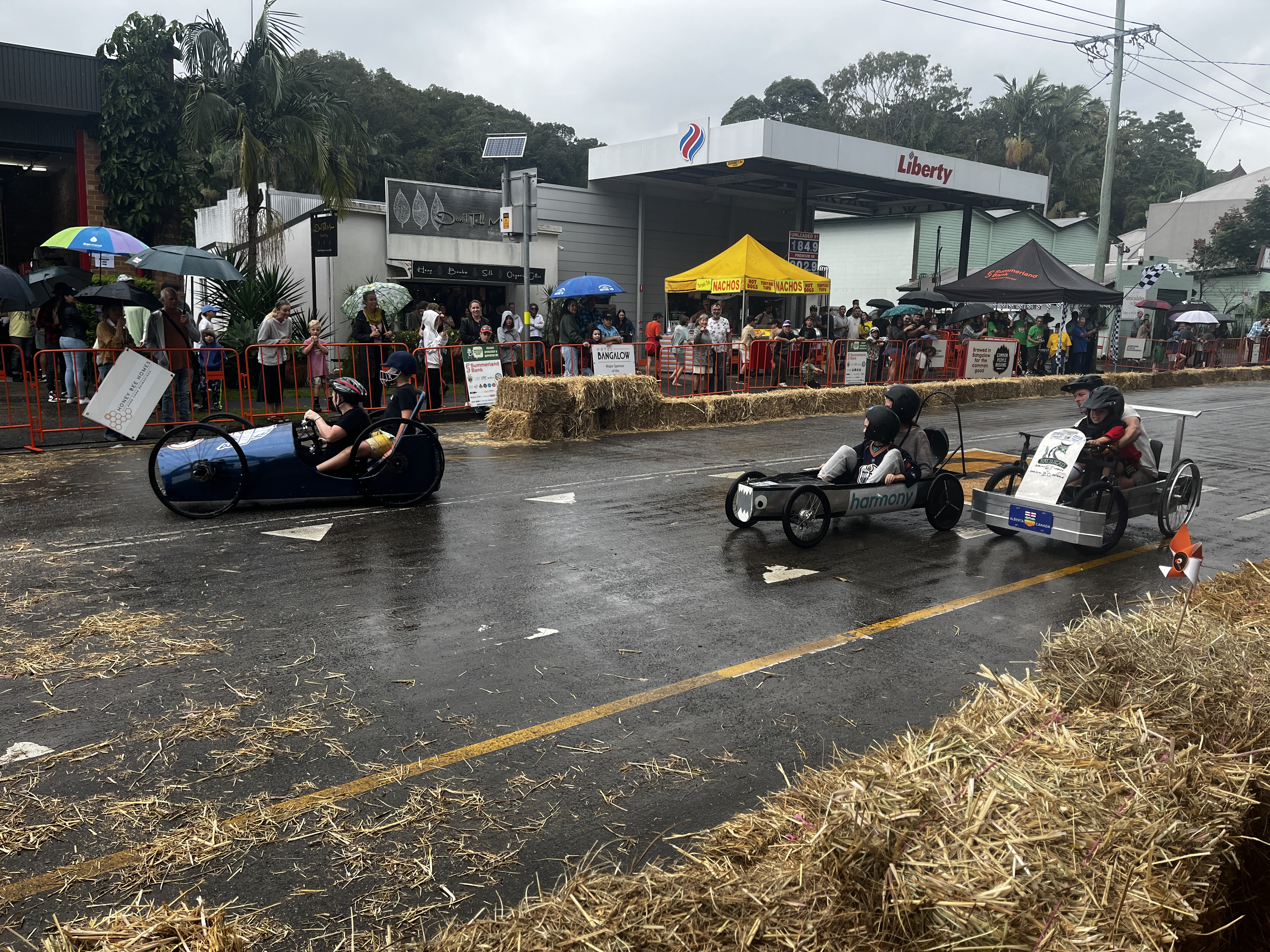
Billycarts at the finish line of the 2025 Bangalow Billycart Derby

A number of events are still held throughout Australia, aimed at bringing together the local community, and encouraging children to stay active and spend time outside in a unique low-cost sociable environment which encourages intergenerational participation. These events are also successful in attracting visitors from surrounding communities and interstate.

The COVID-19 pandemic outbreak in Australia resulted in all annual Billy cart derbies throughout the country being put on hold as event organisers were unable to hold events due to social distancing and other measures implemented by local, state and federal governments. This also resulted in a number of events held annually prior to the outbreak in 2020 being cancelled or postponed indefinitely by organisers.

Rising costs associated with organising billy cart derbies have pressured a number of event organisers to either relocate or cancel events, particularly costs associated with insurance, as a result most events held today require sponsors to pay the costs associated with organising an event. Other pressures include complaints from locals regarding temporary road closures and inflation.

== Design and construction ==
Official rules and regulations for billy cart derbies typically vary between organises, due in part to track layouts, estimated cart speeds, safety concerns & other constraints such as starting ramps.

As a result there are no well-defined categories for design, however it is often observed to be two distinct design styles; traditional & professional. It is commonplace to see these categories separated at organised events to enable increased fairness of competition between entrants.

=== Traditional ===
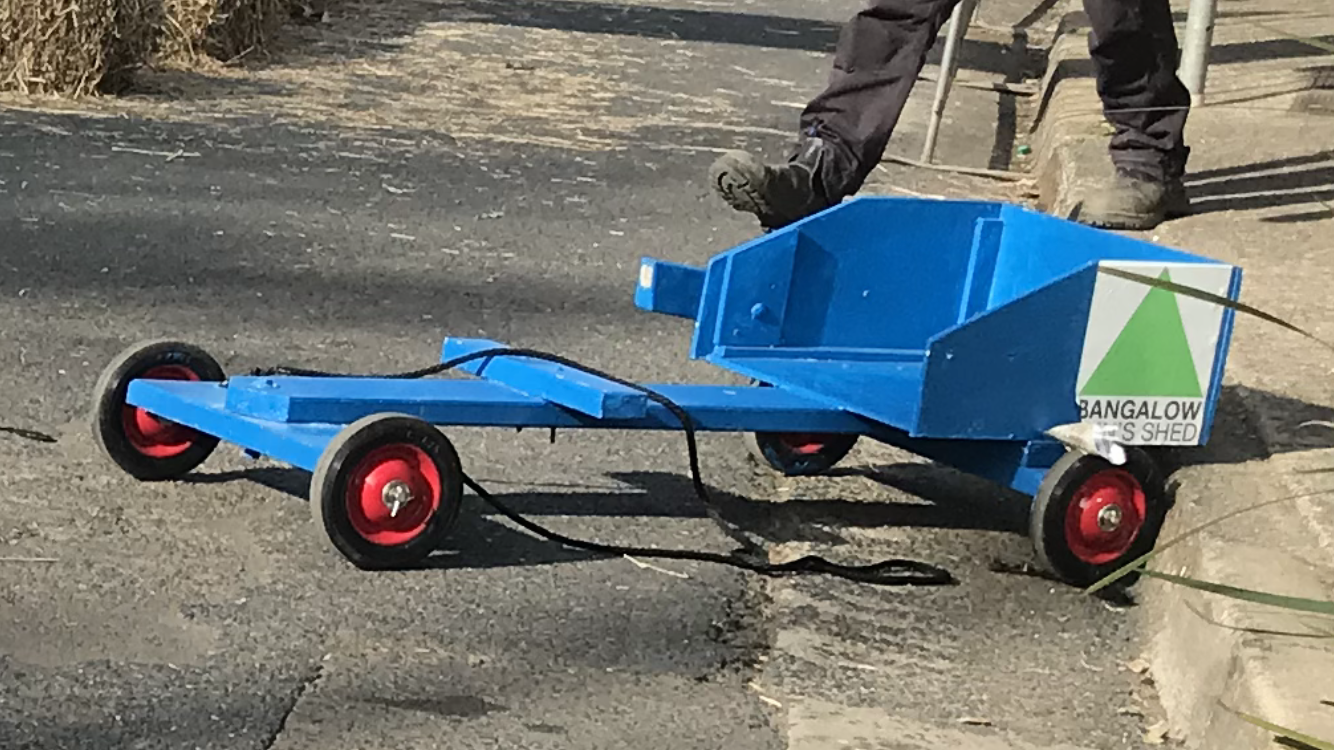
A traditional style billy cart

Traditional carts retain many design cues from billy carts constructed throughout the late 1800s and early 1900s. These include a mostly timber design, upright seating, pivoting front axle with rope steering, plain bearings and solid wheels. Optional design features include a scrub brake on either one or both rear wheels and a wooden block to limit the pivot angle of the front axle.

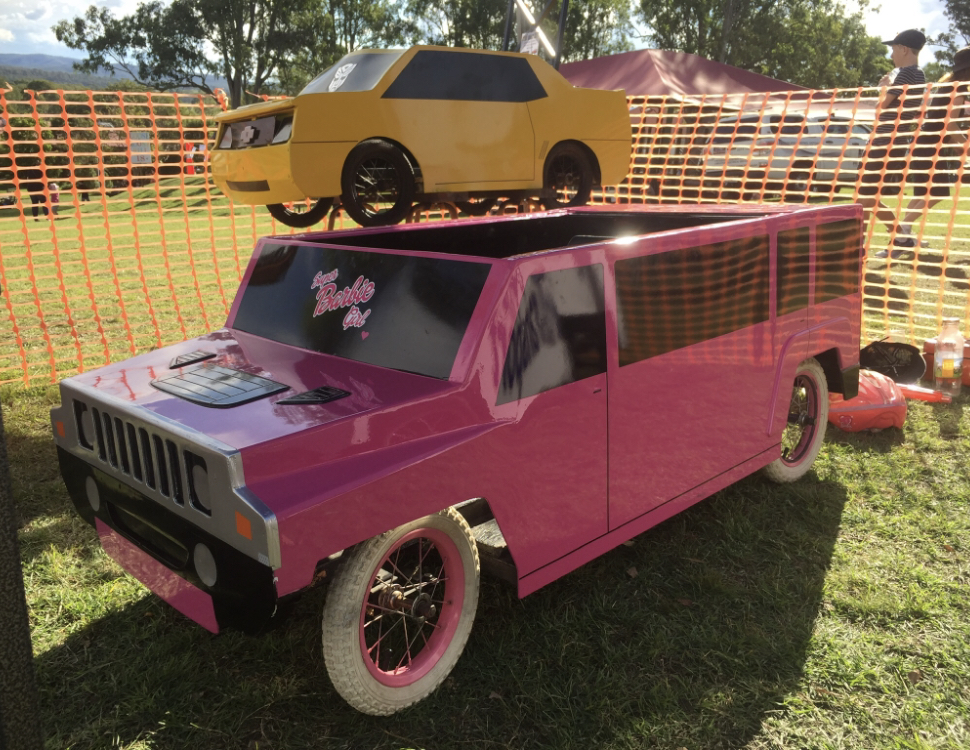
Billy carts on display

Many guides are available online detailing the construction process and this style remains to be a low cost and simple design, able to be easily constructed with common hand and power tools and are still often utilised recreationally by Australian children as well as organisations such as Scouts due to the simplicity of construction.

A number of manufacturers produce these carts for a relatively low cost and can be found in stores throughout Australia as well as online retailers.

=== Professional ===
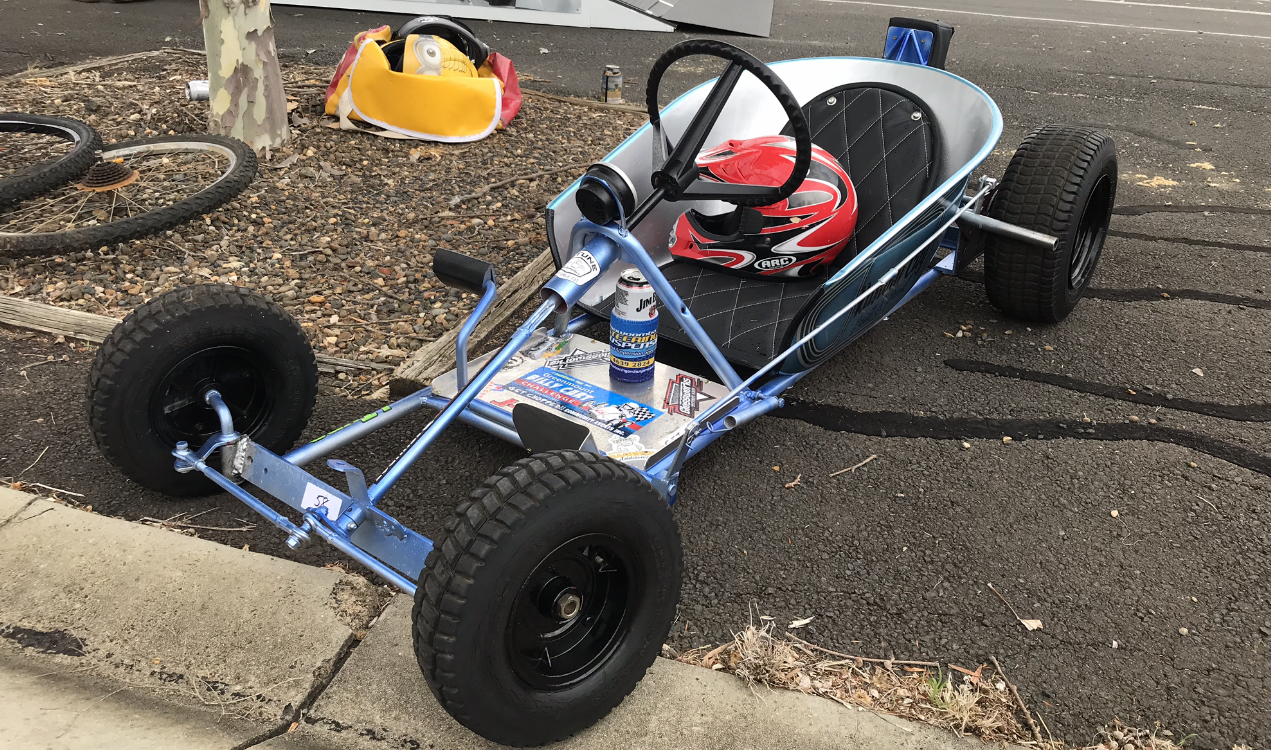
A professional style billy cart constructed from a wheelbarrow

Professional carts form a much broader scope of designs compared to traditional carts, these carts are often capable of reaching speeds much higher than traditional designs as they are larger and heavier, and as such also may feature a range of safety features such as seatbelts and rollcages. Steering is often required by event organisers to utilise either a steering shaft and tie rod design, or handlebars, whilst brakes may range from scrub brakes to rim or disc brakes, typically required to be installed on two or more wheels. The overall construction of carts typically include either timber or metal frames, with most lightweight materials also permitted by event organisers, many carts using materials such as corrugated plastic, polycarbonate, fibreglass and carbon fibre in their designs to improve aerodynamics.

Pneumatic wheels are often utilised for professional carts, repurposed from common items such as wheelbarrows, push bikes and wheelchairs. These are often limited in size by event organisers to ensure safety and typically may either be constructed in a three or four wheel configuration depending on organiser restrictions.

Many professional carts are homemade, however often may require additional power tools during the construction process, due to this, particularly in recent years, many carts are fabricated professionally with some higher-end carts valued around $5000.

It is common that professional carts are designed around a specific theme, these themes can also be an ideal starting point for the design process as it can allow for the design to be unique yet recognisable. One of the most common themes for billy cart designs are vehicles, with some based on vehicle styles such as hot-rods and classic cars, whilst other vehicles used for inspiration include vehicles popularised in film and tv franchises, however designs can often include a broad range of local or pop culture references.

== Billy carts in Australian education ==
STEM Education

STEM Education programs within Australia have incorporated billy carts into a number of programs, with the simplicity of billy cart design allowing for kids of all ages to attempt their own project in a hands-on environment and develop critical thinking skills whilst also learning from the range of mathematical and scientific factors that determine what makes a billy cart design fast including rolling resistance, aerodynamics, and wheel diameters. These programs provide students with an opportunity to create & build upon skills which can be further applied in future studies and careers.

One STEM program sought to address high school students (year 10) not selecting higher level mathematics and science subjects for their final years of study, to achieve this the Design Technology class created a project which involved constructing a billy cart in stages and integrated each of these stages with mathematics and science classes wherein teachers would explore relevant topics such as budgeting, associations between wheel sizes, speed, stability and the forces which affect a billy cart's competitive ability. This program was successful in increasing student enthusiasm for the STEM subjects involved and was found to have positively changed student attitudes on selecting higher level mathematics and science subjects for their final years of study.

Flexible learning programs

Flexible learning option programs can utilise billy carts to provide at-risk students with the opportunity and means to develop key life skills such as engineering, building and design in a hands on environment, with these types of billy cart programs better suited for students which struggle in mainstream classrooms yet thrive in applied learning scenarios. Such inclusions of billy carts in flexible learning can occur either as school-supported entries into existing billy cart races organised outside of schools, or as school-based events organised by the schools themselves.

Incursions, excursions & school-based programs

Billy carts have been widely identified as a great low cost, low risk opportunity for young students to learn key skills such as problem solving and communication in a fun, active and engaging manner. A number of organisations which provide school incursion & excursion programs have included billy carts as a program option, typically requiring students to utilise simple tools and teamwork to build a simple billy cart kit before racing around a short track either being pushed or utilising small hills.

== Billy carts in Australian pop culture and media ==
=== Television ===
- Bananas In Pyjamas – "The Billy Cart Race"
  - Season 4 Episode 58 – Original Series
- Bananas In Pyjamas – "The Billy Cart Race"
  - Season 1 Episode 7 – Animated Series
- Beep and Mort – "Wheelie Good Race"
- Better Homes and Gardens – "How to make a Billy Cart"
  - Also released online as part of an instructional guide.
- C/o The Bartons – "The Great Billycart Aid Race"
  - Season 1 Episode 6
  - Subsequently an image from this episode was featured on back cover of a book of the same name.
- Don’t Blame the Koalas – "Billy Cart Madness"
- Red Bull Billy Cart Race – Melbourne 2022
  - Aired on Channel 7
  - Subsequently was also uploaded to 7Plus
- Talkin' 'Bout Your Generation – "Building a Billy Cart"
  - Season 5 Episode 7
- The Wiggles – "Bill the Billycart"

=== Toys ===
- Bluey – "Rusty & Bluey's Go-Kart Vehicle Playset"

=== Music Videos ===
- Dune Rats – "Space Cadet"
  - Filmed during the 2022 Bangalow Billy Cart Derby
- Profanity Fair – "Wicked City"

== Australian billy cart clubs ==
A number of billy cart clubs have been formed throughout Australia to meet the growing rise in popularity of billy carts. These clubs typically hold events for club members, with stringent rules that ensure both safety and fair competition, however also organise and attend championship races where other clubs are invited to participate.

Another role of billy cart clubs is the promotion of both billy carts and billy cart races to the general public, often done in an effort to boost community interest and reaffirm the valuable lessons that children can learn racing.

Name	Location	Founded	Current Status
Albany Soapbox Club	Albany, Western Australia	1962	Active
Esperance Soapbox Club	Esperance, Western Australia	Unknown	Inactive
Gold Coast Billy Cart Club	Gold Coast, Queensland	2015	Active
Perth Soapbox Club	Perth, Western Australia	1968	Active
Tweed Heads/Gold Coast Billy Cart Association	Tweed Heads, New South Wales, Gold Coast, Queensland	Unknown	Inactive

== Current Annual Billy Cart races in Australia ==
State	Name	Location	Track surface	Date	Organiser
NSW	Bangalow Billycart Derby	Bangalow	Road / Asphalt	May	Bangalow Lions Club
NSW	Beechwood Billycart Classic	Beechwood	Road / Asphalt	October	Beechwood Hotel
NSW	Gresford Billy Cart Derby	Gresford	Road / Asphalt	Easter Saturday	Rotary Club of Dungog
NSW	Leeton Soapbox Derby	Leeton	Road / Asphalt	July	The Australian Art Deco Festival
NSW	Monaro Billy Kart Derby	Cooma	Road / Asphalt	February	Cooma Car Club
NSW	Mount George Billy Cart Derby	Mount George	Grass	September	Mount George School of Arts Hall & Mount George Public School P&C
QLD	Gold Coast Region Billy Cart Rally	Tamborine Mountain	Grass	November	Scouts Gold Coast
QLD	Greenmount Billy Cart Challenge	Greenmount	Road / Asphalt	November	Get Chopped Community Events
QLD	Queensland Day Great Billy Cart Challenge	Gatton	Grass	June	Lockyer Valley Billy Cart Association
QLD	Lockyer Valley Billy Cart Derby	Gatton	Grass	May	Lockyer Valley Billy Cart Association
QLD	Woodhill State School Billy Cart Derby	Woodhill	Grass	July	Woodhill State School
SA	The Mad Dash	Willunga	Road / Asphalt	November	Kiwanis Club of the Fleurieu
VIC	Buller Billycart Bash	Mount Buller	Road / Asphalt	April	Locals Day Out
VIC	Castlemaine Billy Cart Challenge	Castlemaine	Road / Asphalt	October	Rotary Castlemaine
VIC	Queensberry Cup	North Melbourne	Road / Asphalt	October	North & West Melbourne Neighbourhood Centre Inc.
VIC	The Harrow National Bush Billycart Championships	Harrow	Road / Asphalt	March	Harrow National Bush Billycart Association
WA	Albany Championships Weekend	Albany	Road / Asphalt	March	Albany Soapbox Club
WA	Club Race Day	Albany	Road / Asphalt	Monthly	Albany Soapbox Club
WA	Club Race Day	Perth	Road / Asphalt	Monthly	Perth Soapbox Club
WA	Hills Billy Cart Festival	Mount Helena	Road / Asphalt	Autumn	Hills Billy Cart Inc.
WA	Perth Soapbox Club Ross Burton Championships	Perth	Road / Asphalt	September	Perth Soapbox Club
WA	Wundowie Iron Festival & Billy Cart Challenge	Wundowie		September	Wundowie Progress Association & Hills Billy Carts Inc.

== Sources ==
- Bryant, Pauline (1985). "Regional variation in the Australian English lexicon". Australian Journal of Linguistics. 5 (1): 55–66. doi:10.1080/07268608508599336. ISSN 0726-8602.
