= Gravity racer =

Motorless racing vehicle which is propelled by gravity down a slope

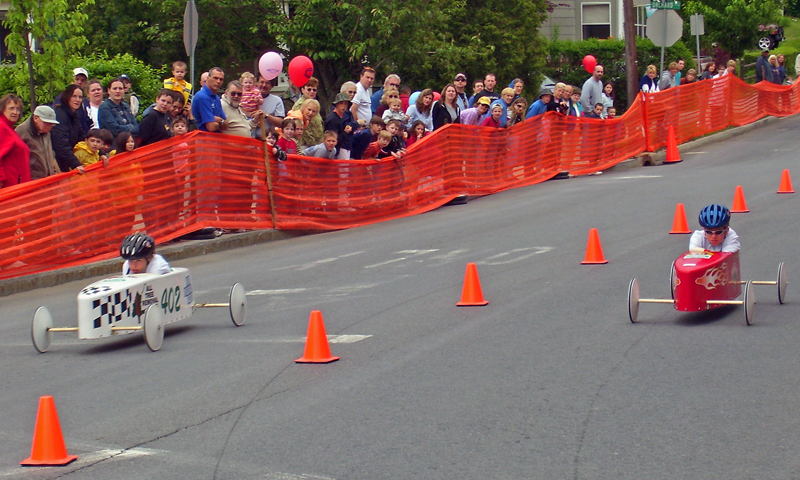
Children racing in a soapbox

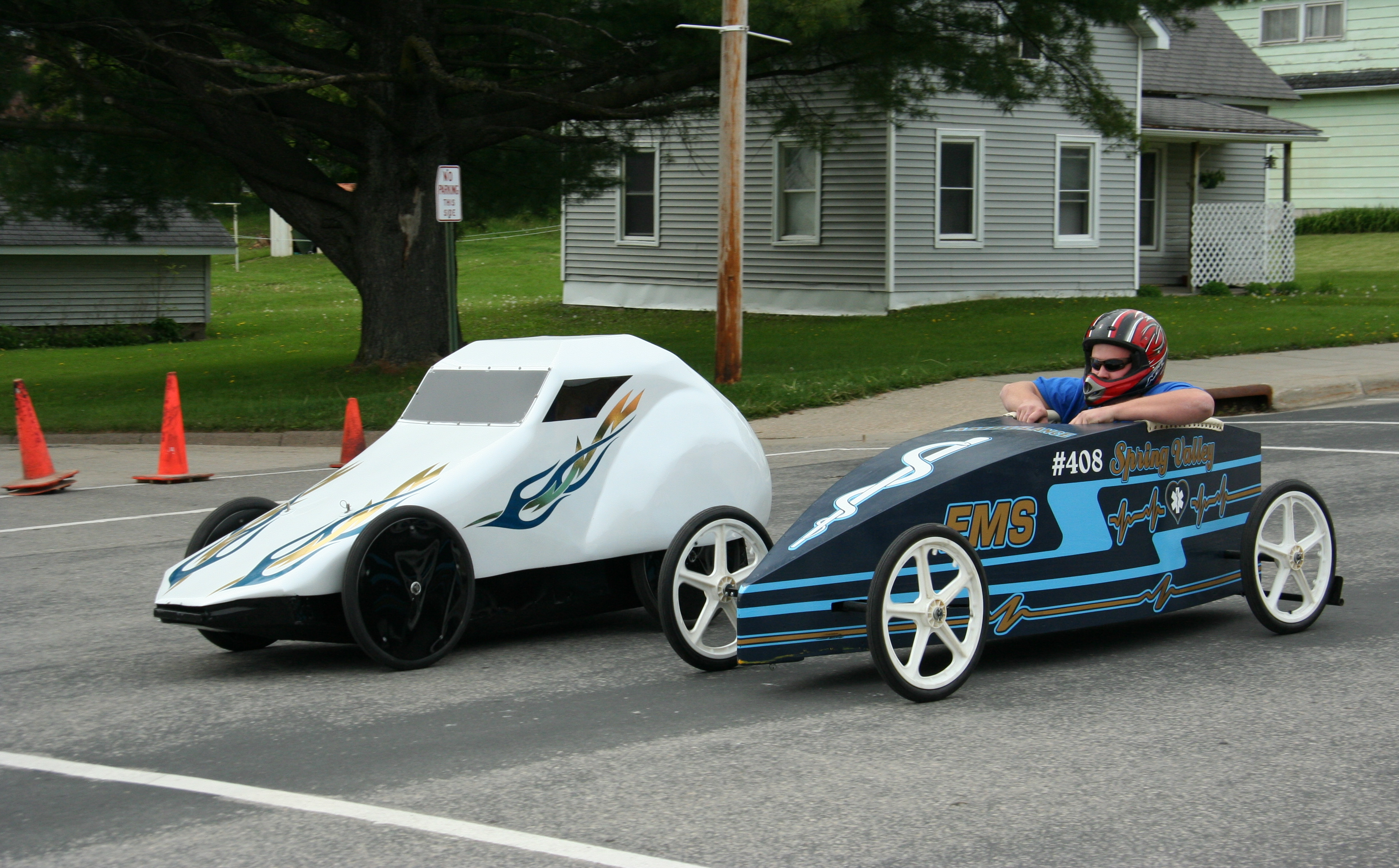
Soapbox cars at the finish line of a race

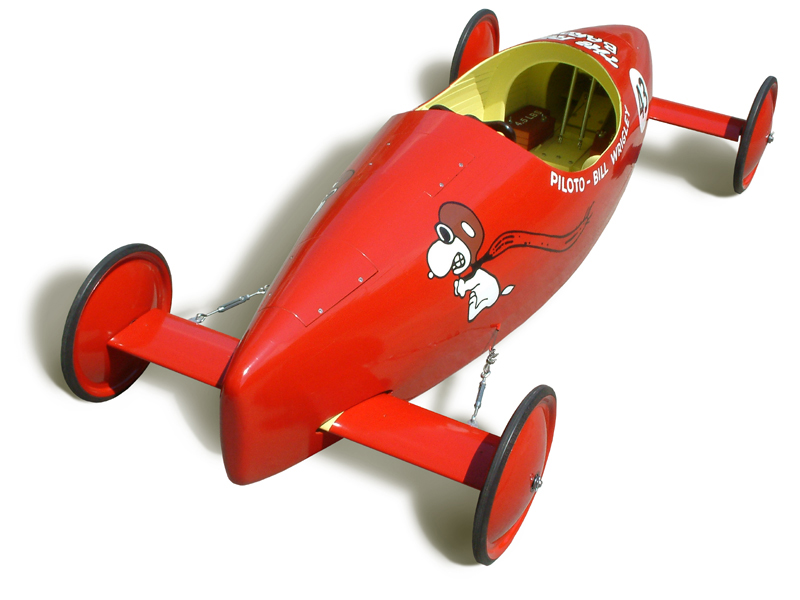
A soap box derby racer from 1968

A gravity racer or soapbox car is a motorless vehicle which is raced on a downhill road either against the clock or against another competitor. The vehicles are powered entirely by gravity; therefore, they are constructed to be as aerodynamic as possible in order to reduce air drag and optimize mass and weight distribution for maximum speed.

== Soapbox cars ==
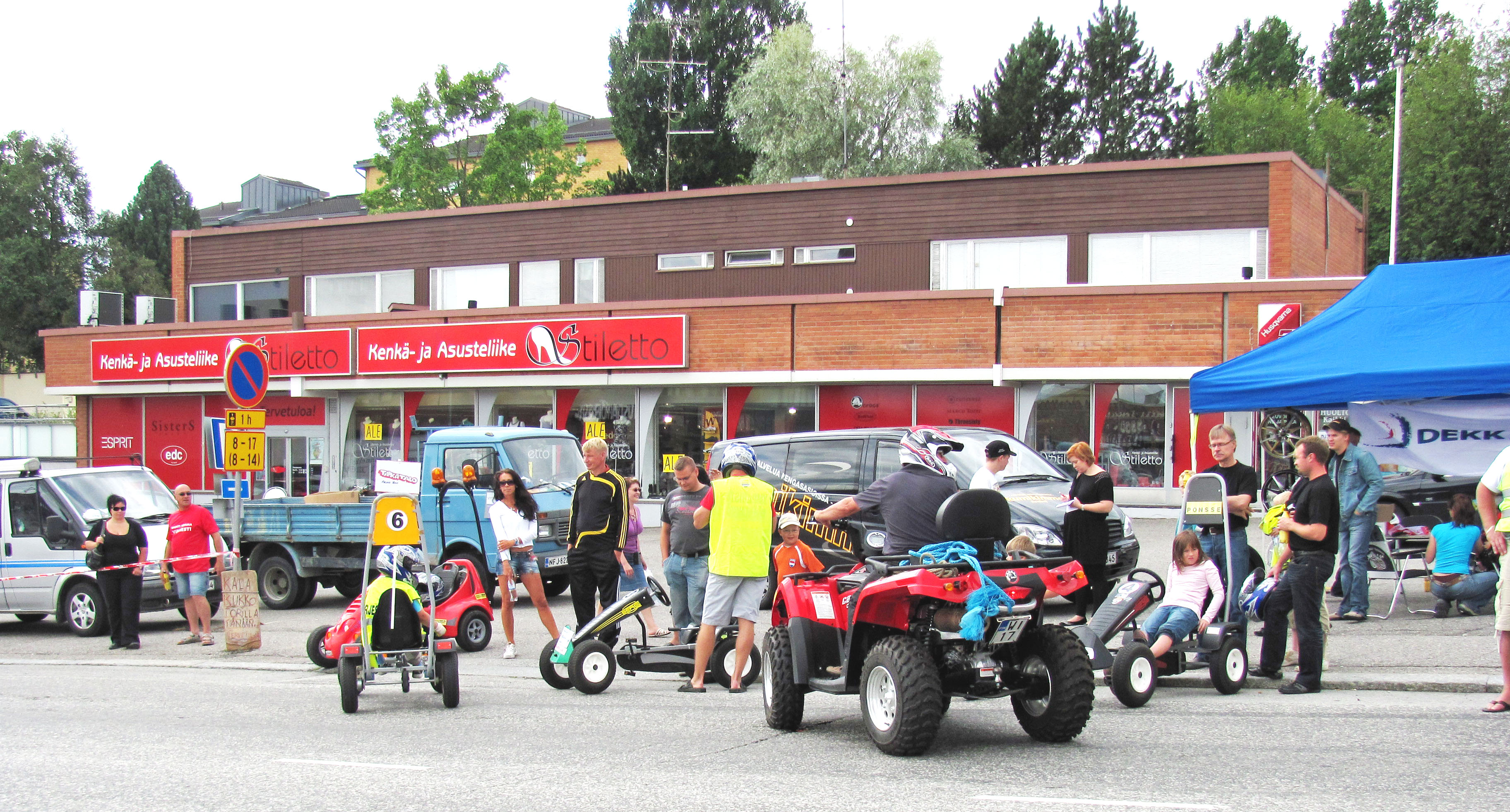
A gravity racer event in Iisalmi, Finland, in 2010

Originally, gravity racers were built from wooden soap (or apple) crates and rollerskate wheels, but have grown more sophisticated over time, with materials like aluminium, fiberglass and even CFRP being used.

In the United Kingdom a gravity racer car has been called a buggy, trolley, cart. It is currently popularly called a soapbox. In Scotland and northern England it has also been called a bogie, cartie/cairtie, guider or piler. In Wales it is often referred to as a gambo. In Australia they are called billy carts, and in Brazil it is known as rolimã.

In addition to being built by children, there are organised competitions and races ("soapbox or billycart derby") that often engage the enthusiasm of adults. However, these are usually entered into in a spirit of fun rather than serious competition. Often they will be fundraisers for charity. Many, but not all, events impose the following rules:

- The car must have no motor
- The car must have at least 4 wheels
- The car may have to have some type of brakes
- The driver must wear a helmet
- A push at the top is allowed for speed

Soapbox cars weigh an average of 150 pounds (68 kg) and reach top speeds of 20 to 30 mph (30 to 50 km/h). Many cities have permanent tracks where drivers compete for prizes.

== Construction ==
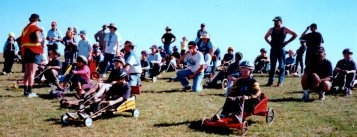
Billy carts constructed by Cub Scouts and their fathers and carers at The Rooty Hill, NSW Australia

A typical gravity racer cart is usually made of steel, and has 4 wheels, arranged as a fixed rear axle, and a steerable front beam axle – usually with a very simple single central pivot. A seat is arranged at the back, and perhaps the seat area is enclosed, as in the original soap-box design. More sophisticated designs might employ a fully enclosed body. The types of wheels employed vary according to what can be obtained easily – wheels from baby carriages, pushchairs, prams, and discarded bicycles being common. Ready-made wheels are also available from hardware suppliers. Steering is typically actuated using a rope connected to the ends of the steerable beam (which can then double as a useful manual pulling device).

More sophisticated steering methods are sometimes seen. Brakes are also commonly used, and most soap-box cart racing contests require these. Often a simple friction brake operated by a lever which bears on one of the tyres is all that is required under the rules.

Gravity racer carts are unpowered, and are either pushed by willing helpers, or are run down a suitable slope. Races will usually take place downhill and the most efficient and skillfully driven cart will win – gravity applying equally to all.

Gravity racer carts also make great construction projects for children, requiring only an intuitive sense of engineering, and a few basic construction skills. There are also pre-designed kits available, though for many this defeats the purpose of the exercise.

Recently, more advanced gravity racers are beginning to emerge. These, intended for competition in the major soapbox races, are sometimes made of carbon fibre and feature a monocoque design, although most use a more traditional chassis or spaceframe design with bodywork made from materials such as plywood, corrugated plastic or similar. Examples of such soapboxes include the Lotus 119c and the Formula Gravity VXR Nimbus.

In Australia, billy carts tend to conform, even in the 21st century, to a more traditional or rudimentary specification which rose to prominence throughout the country in the late 1800s and early 1900s, often constructed by juveniles from scavenged or relatively inexpensive materials. These carts are built with minimal adult input and used in backyards, suburban streets or local parks. However even when construction of vehicles is more formally organised, such as for annual Billy Cart Derbys throughout the country organised by community groups such as Cub Scouts, the vehicle may be constructed to either a traditional or professional standard in accordance with rules and regulations set by the organisers to ensure fair and safe competition.

In Indonesia gravity racers are also known as 'gokar'. They are raced in different regions as a community social activity. The form of the cart is similar to Australian billy cart design. However, the wheels are often motor cycle wheel bearings.

In Brazil gravity racers are known as "carrinhos de rolimã." Traditional designs are very minimalistic, with an open board-like body and wheels made up of naked ball bearings (no tyres allowed), usually discarded parts obtained from auto mechanics.

== History of gravity racer competitions ==
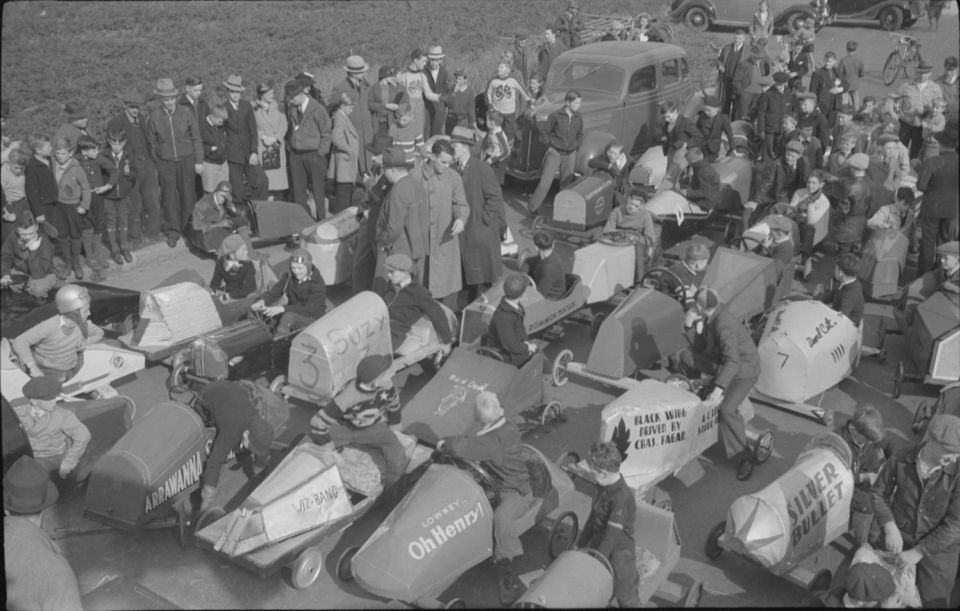
1938 Kinsmen Coaster Classic, the first city-wide soap box race in Montreal, Canada

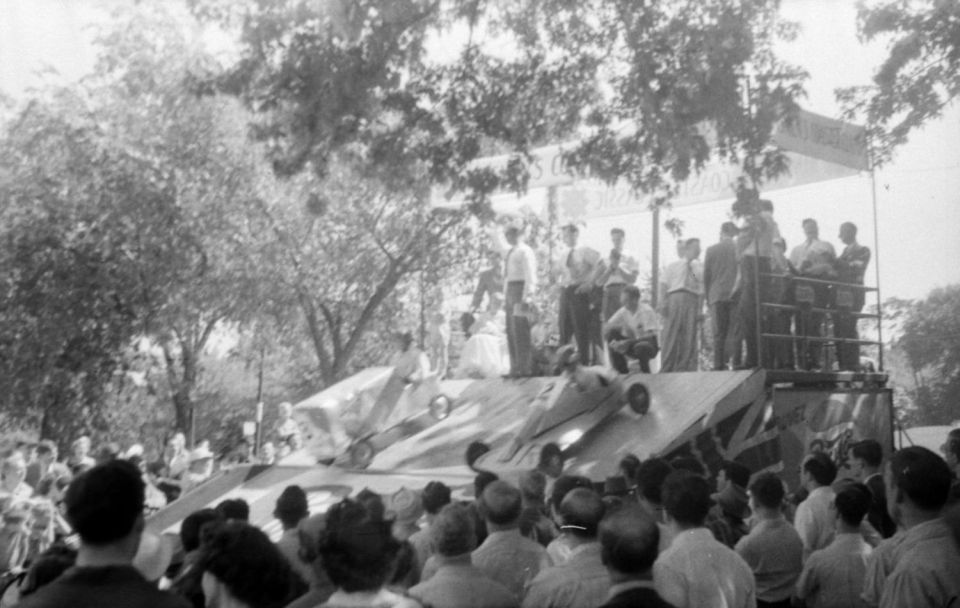
The 7th annual Kinsmen Coaster Classic in 1948

The first recorded gravity race took place in 1904 in Oberursel (Taunus) near Frankfurt, Germany. It was inspired by major motor sports events like the Gordon Bennett Cup and the Kaiserpreis race.

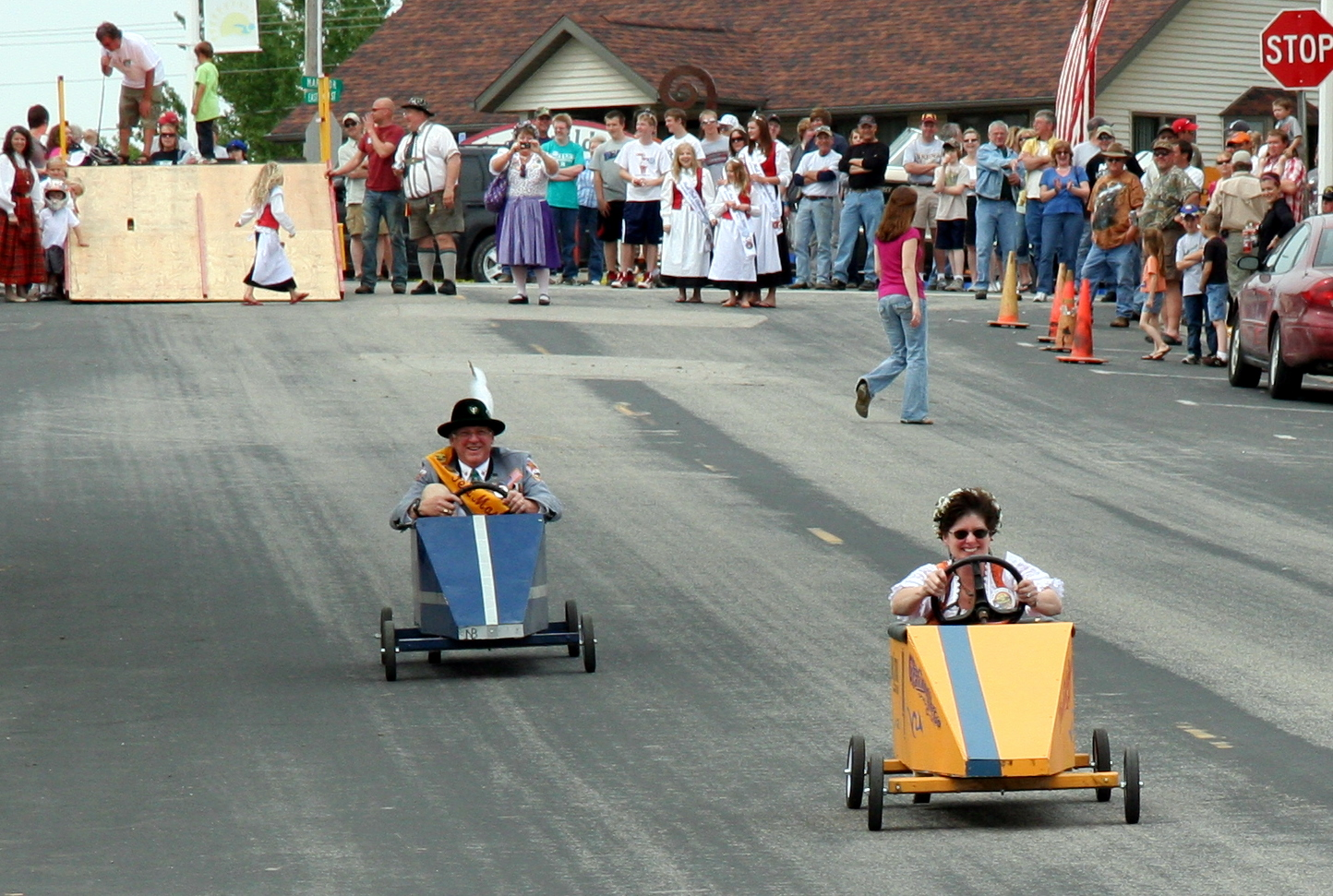
Gravity racer derby at a community celebration in Minnesota, United States

In 1933 Dayton Daily News newspaper photographer Myron Scott of Dayton, Ohio, United States had covered a race of boy-built cars in his home community and was so taken with the idea that he acquired rights to the event; the national-scale Soap Box Derby grew out of this idea. In 1934, Scott had managed to persuade fifty cities across the US to hold soap box car races and send a champion each to Dayton for a major race, later held in Akron. Scott later went on to work for Chevrolet.

In the UK gravity racer derbies have recently become more popular, brought to the masses by large events such as the Red Bull Soapbox Race and that held between 2000 and 2004 at the Goodwood Festival of Speed. Now, many small hilly communities organize their own races, such as the Catterline Cartie Challenge in Scotland and the Belchford Downhill Challenge in Lincolnshire, and there are now several dozen known races across the UK. An annual Soap Box Derby has taken place in mid-July at Richard's Castle on the Shropshire/Herefordshire border since 2004. In addition to the local community races, there are a small number of races which attract more serious competitors, such as Cairngorm Soapbox Extreme (held at Cairn Gorm from 2009 to 2012) and the Worlaby Downhill Challenge. These races tend to produce higher speeds than the community races. Gravity racers taking part in Cairngorm Soapbox Extreme in 2011 reached speeds of 70 mph.

One of the most well-preserved examples of this sport is The Danish Scout Association's annual gravity racer derby, Oak City Rally in Denmark. It is the largest in the world, and every year more than 200 gravity racer compete to complete a route of nearly six miles.

== Physics considerations ==
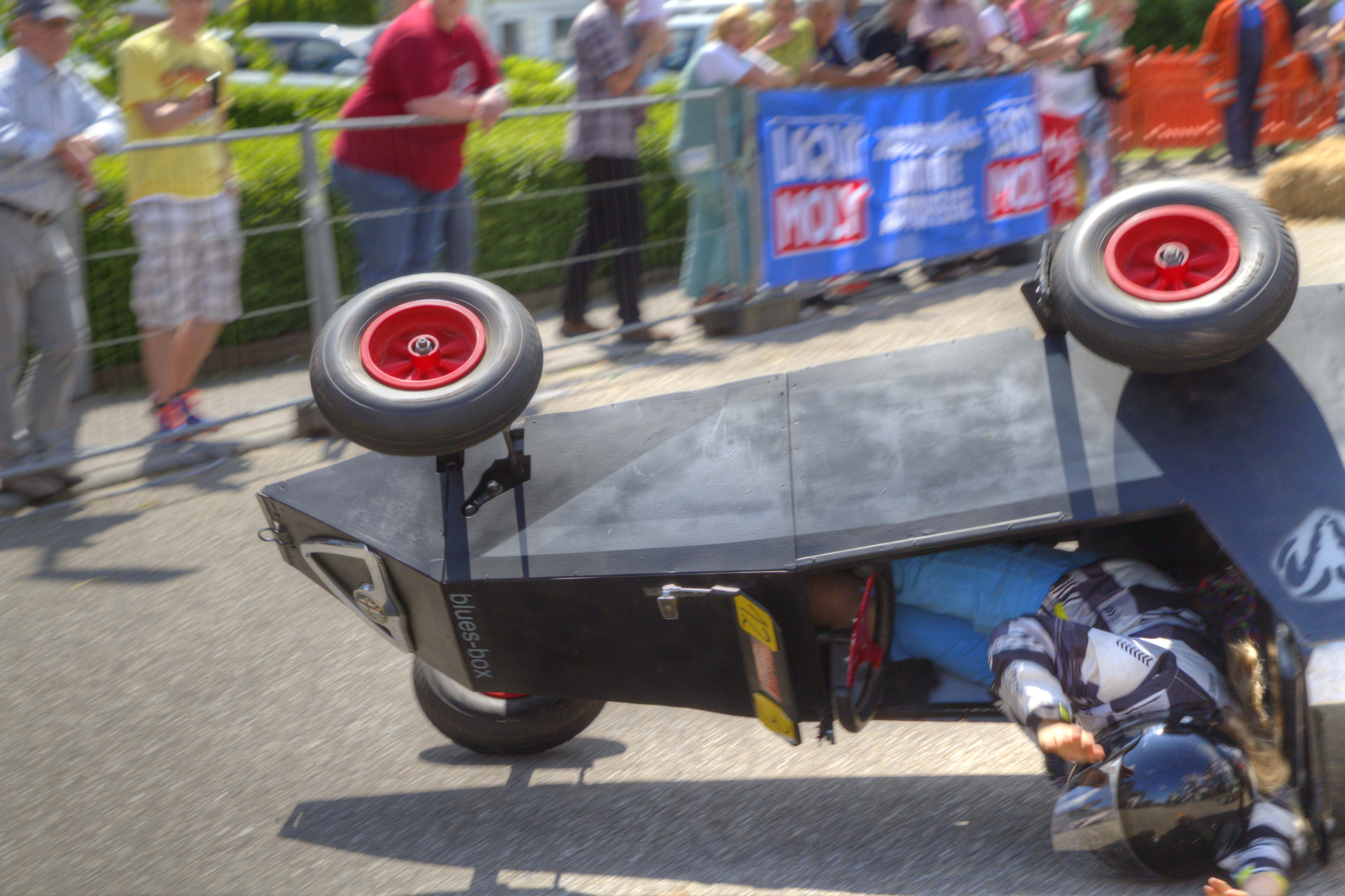
A gravity racer cart rolling in Völkersbach

A gravity racer obtains its energy solely from the force of gravity (assuming no starting push is permitted), which is effectively equal for any combination of racer design and course. However, performance can be greatly affected by the combined effects of various forms of drag and also the moment of inertia of the wheels, and also of course by the skill of the driver in choosing optimal lines. Drag breaks down into aerodynamic drag and rolling resistance. The latter can be minimised by careful attention to the wheel bearings, tyre sizes and pressures, and brakes (to avoid parasitic brake drag). High tyre pressures and narrower tyres will typically lower the tyre contact rolling resistance, usually at the expense of grip. Larger wheels have lower rolling resistance than small ones, and rolling resistance is also proportional to overall weight. If permitted, a 3-wheeler design will have 25% less rotational inertia than a 4-wheeler, all else being equal. Aerodynamic drag can be minimised by designing a fully enclosed body that reduces the drag coefficient, but given that this can be a highly technical thing to achieve especially for the amateur builder, and given that some aerodynamic drag is inevitable, a heavier cart will always do better than a lighter one with the same drag coefficient – its terminal velocity will be higher. For this reason there are usually class weight limits in most controlled forms of the sport. Since some of the potential energy due to gravity must be converted to the kinetic energy of the rotating wheels, a vehicle with lighter wheels will accelerate faster than one with heavier wheels. If a race is started on some form of ramp, having a tail-heavy car can also improve final acceleration, as the effective height of the centre of gravity of the vehicle is raised.

== See also ==
- Buggy at Carnegie Mellon University
- Catterline Cartie Challenge
- Cyclekart
- Goodwood Festival of Speed (hosted its own soapbox derby between 2000 and 2004)
- Kinsmen Coaster Classic
- Lotus 119
- PDX Adult Soapbox Derby
- Pinewood Derby
- Pushcart derby in Jamaica that uses street vending carts.
- Red Bull Soapbox Race
- Soap Box Derby
- Street luge
