= Myron Scott =

American soap box car racer and photographer

Myron E. Scott (September 16, 1907 – October 4, 1998) was the creator of the All-American Soap Box Derby. He is also credited with naming Chevrolet's sports car, the Corvette.

Scott was born in Camden, Ohio. After school hours, he worked for the Dayton Daily News and learned photography, and had pictures published in Life Magazine and other publications.

In 1933, as chief photographer for the Dayton Daily News, he came across a few boys racing one another down a hill in vehicles made of orange crates and soap boxes. With the intention of getting a good photo story and local race with prizes, he persuaded the boys to return with more racers and soapbox cars.

Scott was so enthusiastic with the whole concept that he acquired its copyright; the national-scale Soap Box Derby grew out of this idea. In 1934, Scott managed to persuade 50 cities across the United States to hold soap box car races and send a champion each to Dayton for a major race, a proposal that Chevrolet subsequently sponsored in 1935. The race was later held at Talmadge Hill in Akron, Ohio.

Scott later went on to work for Chevrolet, where he named the Corvette. Chevrolet wanted a non-animal name starting with "C" for the sports car in 1953, and Scott chose the name of a fast ship, the corvette.
