= Elliott Gould filmography =

Actor filmography

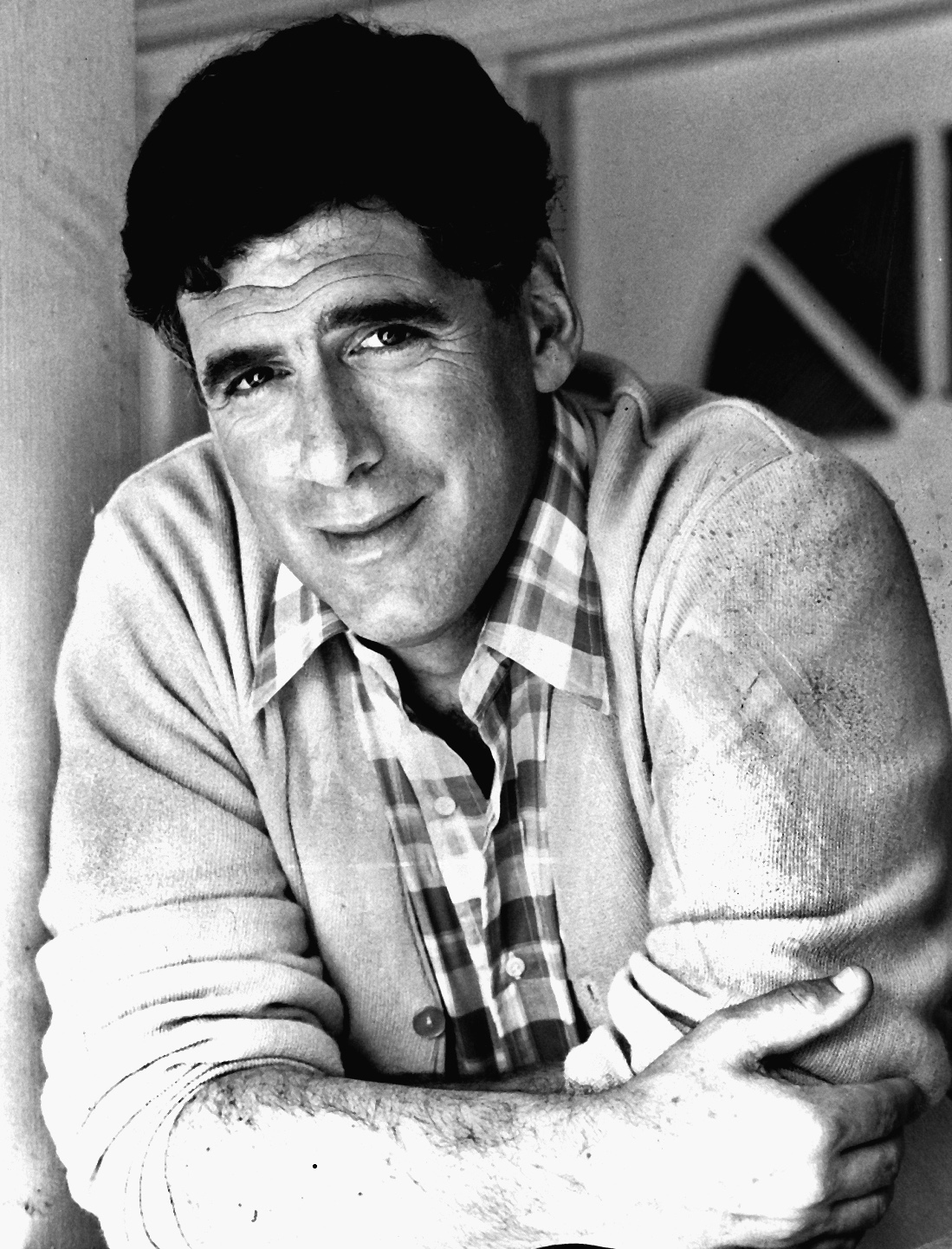
Elliott Gould in 1986

Elliott Gould is an American actor.

He is known for his performances in film such as Bob & Carol & Ted & Alice (1969), M*A*S*H (1970), The Long Goodbye (1973), California Split (1974), A Bridge Too Far (1977), American History X (1998), the Ocean's film franchise (2001, 2004, 2007, 2018), Contagion (2011), and Ruby Sparks (2012).

He is also known for his performances in television shows such as Friends, Ray Donovan, Mulaney, Grace and Frankie, and The Kominsky Method.

== Filmography ==
=== Film ===
| Year | Title | Role | Notes |
|---|---|---|---|
| 1964 | Quick, Let's Get Married | The Mute | |
| 1968 | The Night They Raided Minsky's | Billy Minsky | |
| 1969 | Bob & Carol & Ted & Alice | Ted Henderson | |
| 1970 | M*A*S*H | Capt. "Trapper" John Francis Xavier McIntyre | |
| 1970 | Getting Straight | Harry Bailey | |
| 1970 | Move | Hiram Jaffe | |
| 1970 | I Love My Wife | Richard Burrows | |
| 1971 | Little Murders | Alfred Chamberlain | |
| 1971 | The Touch | David Kovac | |
| 1973 | The Long Goodbye | Philip Marlowe | |
| 1974 | Busting | Vice Detective Michael Keneely | |
| 1974 | Who? | Sean Rogers | |
| 1974 | S*P*Y*S | Griff | |
| 1974 | California Split | Charlie Waters | |
| 1975 | Nashville | Himself | Cameo |
| 1975 | Whiffs | Dudley Frapper | |
| 1975 | Mean Johnny Barrows | The Professor | |
| 1976 | I Will, I Will... for Now | Les Bingham | |
| 1976 | Harry and Walter Go to New York | Walter Hill | |
| 1977 | A Bridge Too Far | Col. Bobby Stout | |
| 1978 | Capricorn One | Robert Caulfield | |
| 1978 | Matilda | Bernie Bonnelli | |
| 1978 | The Silent Partner | Miles Cullen | |
| 1979 | Escape to Athena | Charlie Dane | |
| 1979 | The Muppet Movie | Beauty Contest Compere | Cameo |
| 1979 | The Lady Vanishes | Robert Condon | |
| 1980 | The Last Flight of Noah's Ark | Noah Dugan | |
| 1980 | Falling in Love Again | Harry Lewis | |
| 1981 | The Devil and Max Devlin | Max Devlin | |
| 1981 | Dirty Tricks | Prof. Colin Chandler | |
| 1983 | Tramps | Willie Zobel | |
| 1984 | Over the Brooklyn Bridge | Alby Sherman | |
| 1984 | The Naked Face | Angeli | |
| 1984 | The Muppets Take Manhattan | Cop in Pete's | Cameo |
| 1986 | Inside Out | Jimmy Morgan | |
| 1987 | Lethal Obsession | Serge Gart | |
| 1987 | My First Forty Years | Nino Ranuzzi | |
| 1988 | The Telephone | Rodney | |
| 1988 | Dangerous Love | Rick | |
| 1989 | The Big Picture | Lawyer | Uncredited cameo |
| 1989 | Night Visitor | Ron Devereaux | |
| 1989 | The Lemon Sisters | Fred Frank | |
| 1989 | Massacre Play | Theo Steiner | |
| 1989 | Secret Scandal | Film director | |
| 1990 | I'll Be Going Now | Alcide | |
| 1990 | Dead Men Don't Die | Barry Barron | |
| 1991 | Bugsy | Harry Greenberg | |
| 1991 | Beyond Justice | Red Murchison | |
| 1992 | The Player | Himself | Cameo |
| 1992 | Judgement | Judge Callow | Direct-to-video |
| 1992 | Wet and Wild Summer! | Mike McCain | |
| 1993 | Amore! | George Levine | |
| 1993 | Hoffman's Hunger | Felix Hoffman | |
| 1994 | Naked Gun 33 1/3: The Final Insult | Himself | Uncredited cameo |
| 1994 | The Glass Shield | Greenspan | |
| 1994 | Bleeding Hearts | Mr. Baum | |
| 1995 | A Boy Called Hate | Richard | |
| 1995 | Kicking and Screaming | Grover's Dad | |
| 1995 | Cover Me | Capt. Richards | |
| 1995 | The Dangerous | Levine | |
| 1995 | The Feminine Touch | Kahn | Direct-to-video |
| 1996 | Johns | Manny Gold | |
| 1997 | Inside Out | Aaron's Father | Short film |
| 1997 | City of Industry | Gangster | Uncredited cameo |
| 1997 | Busted | TV show host | Direct-to-video |
| 1997 | Camp Stories | Older David Katz | |
| 1998 | Michael Kael vs. the World News Company | Coogan | |
| 1998 | The Big Hit | Morton Shulman | |
| 1998 | American History X | Murray | |
| 1998 | Caminho dos Sonhos | Samuel Stern | |
| 2000 | Playing Mona Lisa | Bernie Goldstein | |
| 2000 | Picking Up the Pieces | Father LaCage | |
| 2000 | Boys Life 3 | Aaron's Father | Segment: "Inside Out" |
| 2001 | Ocean's Eleven | Reuben Tishkoff | |
| 2001 | The Experience Box | Dr. Keith Huber | Also producer |
| 2002 | Puckoon | Dr. Goldstein | |
| 2002 | The Cat Returns | Toto | English dub |
| 2004 | Ocean's Twelve | Reuben Tishkoff | |
| 2006 | Open Window | John | |
| 2007 | Ocean's Thirteen | Reuben Tishkoff | |
| 2007 | Saving Sarah Cain | Bill | |
| 2007 | The Ten Commandments | God | Voice; Direct-to-DVD |
| 2008 | The Deal | Rabbi Seth Gutterman | |
| 2008 | The Caller | Frank Turlotte | |
| 2009 | Little Hercules in 3-D | Socrates | |
| 2010 | Expecting Mary | Horace Weitzel | |
| 2010 | Morning | Male Doctor Goodman | |
| 2011 | The Encore of Tony Duran | Jerry Braill | |
| 2011 | Contagion | Dr. Ian Sussman | |
| 2011 | Dorfman | Burt Dorfman | |
| 2011 | Art & Sex | Therapist | Also executive producer |
| 2012 | Noah's Ark: The New Beginning | God | Voice; Direct-to-DVD |
| 2012 | Switchmas | Sam Finkelstein | |
| 2012 | Fred Won't Move Out | Fred | |
| 2012 | Ruby Sparks | Dr. Rosenthal | |
| 2012 | Divorce Invitation | Paul Lipnicks | |
| 2013 | Live at the Foxes Den | Paul Munchak | |
| 2014 | Yellowbird | The Owl | Voice |
| 2016 | The History of Love | Bruno Leibovitch | |
| 2017 | Humor Me | Bob Kroll | |
| 2018 | Ocean's 8 | Reuben Tishkoff | |
| 2020 | Dangerous Lies | Leonard | |
| 2023 | You People | Mr. Greenbaum | |
| 2024 | Legend of Destruction | Rabbi Ben Zakkai | English dub |

Sources: Turner Classic Movies

=== Television ===
| Year | Title | Role | Notes |
|---|---|---|---|
| 1964 | Once Upon a Mattress | Jester | Television film |
| 1972 | The Special London Bridge Special | The Villain | Television special |
| 1976 | ABC Olivia Newton-John Special with Elliott Gould | Himself | Television special |
| 1976–1980 | Saturday Night Live | Himself (host) | 6 episodes |
| 1979 | Cher... and Other Fantasies | Sign Painter | Television special |
| 1982 | The Rules of Marriage | Michael Hagen | Television film |
| 1983 | Faerie Tale Theatre | The Giant | Episode: "Jack and the Beanstalk" |
| 1984–1985 | E/R | Dr. Howard Sheinfeld | 23 episodes |
| 1986 | Vanishing Act | Lieutenant Rudameyer | Television film |
| 1986 | The Twilight Zone | Harry Folger | Episode: "The Misfortune Cookie" |
| 1986 | Tall Tales & Legends | Casey | Episode: "Casey at the Bat" |
| 1986 | Together We Stand | David Randall | 6 episodes |
| 1987 | Conspiracy: The Trial of the Chicago 8 | Leonard Weinglass | Television film |
| 1987 | Frog | Bill Anderson | Television film |
| 1988 | Act of Betrayal | Callaghan | Television film |
| 1989 | Murder, She Wrote | Lt. J. T. Hanna | Episode: "The Error of Her Ways" |
| 1990 | Stolen: One Husband | Martin Slade | Television film |
| 1991 | Sessions | Dr. Bookman | 6 episodes |
| 1991 | The Hitchhiker | Augie Benson | Episode: "A Whole New You" |
| 1991 | Beyond Justice | Red Murchison | 3 episodes |
| 1992 | The Ray Bradbury Theatre | Leo Auffmann | Episode: "The Happiness Machine" |
| 1992 | Somebody's Daughter | Hindeman | Television film |
| 1993 | Frogs! | Bill Anderson | Television film |
| 1993 | Bloodlines: Murder in the Family | Stewart Woodman | Television film |
| 1993 | L.A. Law | Ed Morrison | 3 episodes |
| 1993 | Moon Over Miami | Gavin Mills | Episode: "In a Safe Place" |
| 1994 | Lois & Clark: The New Adventures of Superman | Vincent Winninger | Episode: "Witness" |
| 1994 | Burke's Law | Harry Waters | Episode: "Who Killed the Host at the Roast?" |
| 1994 | Screen One | Joe Warren | Episode: "Doggin' Around" |
| 1994–2003 | Friends | Jack Geller | 20 episodes |
| 1995 | The Magic School Bus | Mr. Perlstein | Episode: "Going Batty" |
| 1995 | Cybill | Himself | Uncredited; Episode: "The Last Temptation of Cybill" |
| 1995 | P.C.H | Randy's Father | Television film |
| 1996 | Touched by an Angel | Max | Episode: "Dear God" |
| 1997 | The Shining | Stuart Ullman | Episode #1.1 |
| 1997 | Shanghai 1937 | Hutchinson | 2 episodes |
| 1997–1998 | Hey Arnold! | Rabbi Goldberg (voice) | 2 episodes |
| 1998 | Diagnosis: Murder | Peyton Cartwright | Episode: "Drill for Death" |
| 1998 | Mentors | Albert Einstein | Episode: "The Genius" |
| 1998 | Getting Personal | Jack Kacmarczyk | 17 episodes |
| 1999 | It's Like, You Know... | Himself | 3 episodes |
| 2000 | Just Shoot Me! | Himself | Uncredited; Episode: "Hot Nights in Paris" |
| 2001 | Life with David J | Todd | Pilot |
| 2002–2003 | Baby Bob | Sam Spencer | 14 episodes |
| 2003 | The Simpsons | Himself (voice) | Episode: "The Dad Who Knew Too Little" |
| 2003 | Vegas Dick | Clay | Pilot |
| 2003 | Las Vegas | The Professor | Episode: "Jokers and Fools" |
| 2003 | K Street | Bergstrom | 3 episodes |
| 2003, 2007 | Kim Possible | Mr. Stoppable (voice) | 7 episodes |
| 2003 | Kim Possible: A Sitch in Time | Mr. Stoppable (voice) | Television film |
| 2004 | Bad Apple | Buddha Stanzione | Television film |
| 2005 | Crumbs | Frank Bergman | 2 episodes |
| 2005 | Agatha Christie's Poirot | Rufus Van Aldin | Episode: "The Mystery of the Blue Train" |
| 2006 | Masters of Horror | Barney | Episode: "The Screwfly Solution" |
| 2007 | St. Urbain's Horseman | Uncle Abe | 2 episodes |
| 2007 | American Dad! | Russell Rothberg (voice) | Episode: An Apocalypse to Remember |
| 2008 | WordGirl | Masked Meat Marauder (voice) | Episode: "The Masked Meat Marauder" |
| 2009 | Drop Dead Diva | Larry Baxter | Episode: "Second Chances" |
| 2009 | Law & Order | Stan Harkavy | Episode: "Shotgun" |
| 2009 | Uncorked | Paul Browning | Television film |
| 2010 | The Life & Times of Tim | Dr. Fishman (voice) | Episode: "Personality Disorder" |
| 2010 | CSI: Crime Scene Investigation | Earnest Boozell | Episode: "Pool Shark" |
| 2011 | The Cape | Samuel | 2 episodes |
| 2012 | Law & Order: Special Victims Unit | Walter Thompkins | Episode: "Lessons Learned" |
| 2012 | I'm Not Dead Yet | Irv | Television film |
| 2012 | Listen to Grandpa, Andy Ling | Grandpa | 3 episodes |
| 2013–2016 | Ray Donovan | Ezra Goldman | 19 episodes |
| 2013 | Back in the Game | Louie | Episode: "I'll Slide Home for Christmas" |
| 2014 | Sensitive Skin | Dr. H. Cass | 3 episodes |
| 2014 | The Michaels | Max Barnworth | Television film |
| 2014–2015 | Mulaney | Oscar | 13 episodes |
| 2015 | Maron | Himself | Episode: "Stroke of Luck" |
| 2015 | Oscar's Hotel for Fantastical Creatures | Sir Loin (voice) | Episode: "Hunger Pains" |
| 2016 | Hawaii Five-0 | Leo Hirsch | Episode: "Pilina Koko" |
| 2017 | Doubt | Isaiah Roth | 13 episodes |
| 2017–2018 | 9JKL | Harry | 16 episodes |
| 2018 | The Kominsky Method | Himself | Episode: "An Agent Crowns" |
| 2020 | Grace and Frankie | Dr. Rogers | Episode: "The Funky Walnut" |
| 2021 | Friends: The Reunion | Himself | HBO Max special |
| 2021 | Ten Year Old Tom | Tom's Grampa (voice) | Episode: "Tomz Lemonade/A Tale of Two Lunch Ladies" |
| 2021 | Fairfax | Uncle Mendy (voice) | Episode: "Fairfolks" |
| 2022–2026 | The Lincoln Lawyer | David "Legal" Siegel | 13 episodes |
| 2025 | Monster: The Ed Gein Story | Weegee | Epiode: "Ice" |

=== Video games ===
| Year | Title | Voice Role | Notes |
|---|---|---|---|
| 1997 | Blue Heat: The Case of the Cover Girl Murders | Captain Richards | |
| 2005 | Friends: The One with All the Trivia | Jack Geller | |
| 2006 | Scarface: The World Is Yours | Brent Stein | |

== Theatre ==
| Year | Title | Role | Venue |
|---|---|---|---|
| 1957 | Rumple | Ensemble | Alvin Theatre, Broadway |
| 1958 | Say, Darling | Earl Jorgensen | ANTA Theatre, Broadway |
| 1960 | Irma La Douce | Various roles | The Plymouth Theatre, Broadway |
| 1962 | I Can Get It for You Wholesale | Harry Bogen | Shubert Theatre, Broadway |
| 1965 | Drat! The Cat! | Bob Purefoy | Martin Beck Theatre, Broadway |
| 1967 | Little Murders | Alfred Chamberlain | Broadhurst Theatre, Broadway |
| 1983 | The Guys in the Truck | Al Klein | New Apollo Theatre, Broadway |

Sources: Playbill and IBDB
