= Rick Rossovich =

American actor

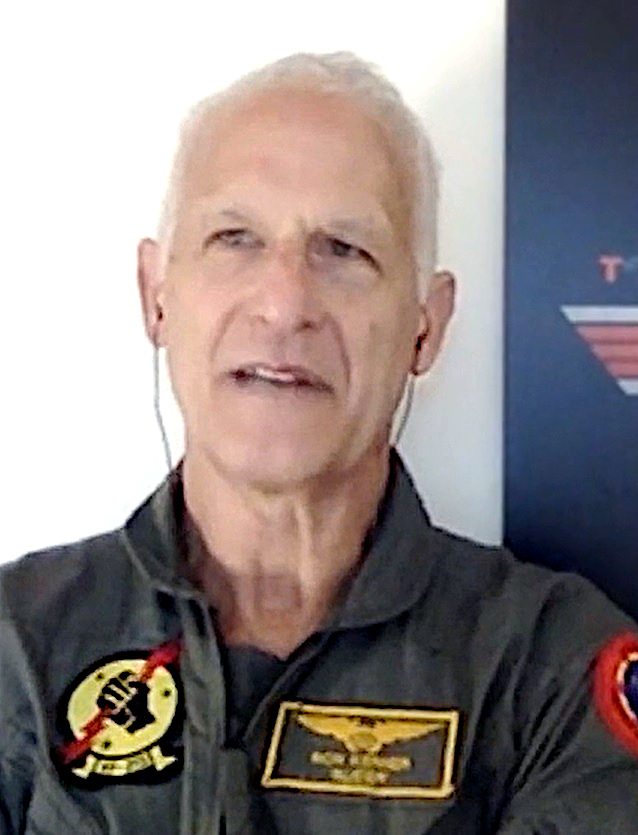
- Rossovich in 2020
- Born: Frederic Enrico Rossovich; August 28, 1957 (age 69); Palo Alto, California, U.S.
- Occupation: Actor
- Years active: 1978–2017
- Spouse: Eva Rossovich
- Children: 2

Frederic Enrico Rossovich (born August 28, 1957) is a retired American actor. Rossovich began acting in the early 1980s, first gaining recognition for portraying Ron "Slider" Kerner in the 1986 film Top Gun. Rossovich's other movies include the thriller-drama The Lords of Discipline (1983), the sex comedy Losin' It (1983), the science-fiction film The Terminator (1984), the romantic comedy Roxanne (1987), the witchcraft-themed thriller Spellbinder (1988), the thriller Paint It Black (1989), the military action film Navy SEALs (1990), and the Disney Channel Original Movie Miracle in Lane 2 (2002). Rossovich is also recognized for his lead role in the TV series Pacific Blue, often described as a "Baywatch on bikes", which ran on the USA Network for five seasons between March 1996 and April 2000 and also gained popularity abroad. He also portrayed Dr. John Taglieri in the first season of ER and Spud Lincoln in the CBS series Sons and Daughters (1991).

== Early life ==
Rossovich was born Frederic Enrico Rossovich in Palo Alto, California, and grew up in Grass Valley, California, eventually graduating from Nevada Union High School. His brother, Tim, was a former professional football player and also an actor. He attended college at Sacramento State University. He was a bodybuilder during his late teens and early 20s. Rossovich has Croatian and Italian ancestry; his mother's family originates from the Tuscany region of Italy, while his father's family comes from Istria, Croatia. His great-grandfather emigrated to the United States from Mošćenička Draga, a coastal town in Istria, Croatia, whence the surname Rossovich originates, as it was first found there.

== Career ==
Rossovich's first big movie break came when he was cast as Cadet First Lieutenant Dante Pignetti in the drama-thriller The Lords of Discipline, with Bill Paxton and Michael Biehn. The movie helped launch Paxton and Biehn's careers, and Rossovich went on to work again with both Biehn and Paxton in The Terminator and Navy SEALs. Paxton and he worked together also in Streets of Fire, an American neo-noir rock musical film directed and co-written by Walter Hill. Rossovich's next movie was Losin' It, a "teenage romp down to Mexico... and [Rossovich] played a marine who the kids kept coming across, and which resulted in some high jinks." Losin' It was Tom Cruise's first lead role. Rossovich and Cruise, who Rossovich considers "a great guy," first met on the set of Losin' It. The two would become friends, and go on to star together in Rossovich's biggest hit and one of Tom Cruise's most memorable works, Top Gun. On the set of Top Gun, Rossovich also "really bonded with Val Kilmer," partly due to their respective roles in the movie and the relationship of their characters. Rossovich has stated that bonding with Kilmer came "so naturally," and that Kilmer and he were "kind of like brothers." In 1984, Rossovich was cast as Ginger's boyfriend Matt in The Terminator. Between 'that film and Top Gun, Rossovich starred in Streets of Fire, where he plays Officer Cooley, and meets again with Bill Paxton; the sci-fi horror film Warning Sign, where he plays Bob; the action film Let's Get Harry, in which he plays Kurt Kleein; and the neo noir mystery film The Morning After, where he plays the Detective.

=== Late 1980s ===
In the wake of Top Gun, Rossovich gained a major role in the Golden Globe-nominated and critically acclaimed Roxanne, a modern retelling of Cyrano de Bergerac starring Steve Martin and Daryl Hannah. He subsequently went on to star in the thriller Spellbinder alongside Kelly Preston; the dark fantasy horror comedy Waxwork; and the thriller Paint It Black, alongside Martin Landau and Sally Kirkland.

=== 1990s ===
Rossovich started off the 1990s with what became one of his most notable roles, that of Corpsman James Leary in the military action film Navy SEALs, alongside Charlie Sheen, Michael Biehn, and Bill Paxton, with whom he had already worked multiple times. Rossovich starred in a number of minor movies in the early 1990s, the most notable of which was the direct-to-video erotic thriller Cover Me, alongside Paul Sorvino, Elliott Gould, and Corbin Bernsen. In the late 1990s, Rossovich landed a role on the long-running American medical drama television series E.R., playing Dr. John "Tag" Taglieri, Carol Hathaway's love interest in season one. From 1996 to 1998, Rossovich starred as the lead character in the crime drama series Pacific Blue. The series achieved some success in the U.S., and was run in many other countries; in some of these (such as Italy), the series is still being broadcast on national television to this day. In the late 1990s, Rossovich starred in a few other movies, the most notable of which being Truth or Consequences, N.M. with Kiefer Sutherland and the 1998 romantic comedy Telling You, for which he made an uncredited cameo.

=== 2000s ===
Rossovich's career, which had been declining in the late 1990s, came to a halt in the 2000s. He starred in the Disney Channel Original Movie Miracle in Lane 2 alongside Malcolm in the Middle star Frankie Muniz in 2000 and in the crime film Artworks alongside Virginia Madsen in 2003 before going into retirement. Upon selling his Hollywood Hills home, Rossovich moved from Los Angeles to Ojai, California, where he and his wife spent 18 months restoring a house in the early 1990s. He then moved to Sweden, where he resided as of 2016. After giving up cinema and his Hollywood life, Rossovich attempted a return to acting in 2012, with the comedy drama Sandbar. Rossovich does not appear to be contemplating to return to acting steadily, as in 2012, he stated: "I've had a really great marriage and kids. I've saved my money and invested. I can do what I want. I guess that's a blessing and a curse. It takes away some of your drive to go out and be a workaholic."

Rossovich has made guest appearances in such TV shows as Tales from the Crypt, Mad About You, Murder, She Wrote and Due South. In 2007, he appeared with his son, Roy, in an episode of House Hunters International set in Stockholm, Sweden.

== Filmography ==
=== Film ===
Year	Title	Role	Notes
1983	Losin' It	Marine	
1983	The Lords of Discipline	Dante 'Pig' Pignetti	
1984	Streets of Fire	Officer Cooley	
1984	The Terminator	Matt	
1985	Warning Sign	Bob	
1986	Let's Get Harry	Kurt Klein	
1986	The Morning After	Detective	
1986	Top Gun	Lieutenant Junior Grade Ron 'Slider' Kerner	
1987	Roxanne	Chris McConnell	
1988	Spellbinder	Derek Clayton	
1988	Cognac	Bogoljub / Nikamia	
1988	Waxwork	Michael Loftmore	Uncredited
1989	Paint It Black	Jonathan Dunbar	
1989	The Roommate		Short Film
1990	Navy SEALs	Leary	
1993	The Evil Inside Me	Daniel	Also known as Fatally Yours
1993	Tropical Heat	Gravis	
1994	Future Shock	Frat Boy	
1994	New Crime City	Anthony Ricks	Lead role
1995	Cover Me	Sergeant Bobby Colter	
1995	Black Scorpion	Lieutenant Stan Walker	
1996	Black Scorpion II: Aftershock	Construction Foreman	
1997	Truth or Consequences, N.M.	Robert Boylan	
1998	Telling You	McQueeney	(uncredited)
2003	Artworks	Bret Rogers	
2012	Sandbar	Ronnie McCubbing	
2016	A Beautiful Day	Jack	

=== Television ===
Year	Title	Role	Notes
1978	Fantasy Island	Abdul (uncredited)	Episode: "King for a Day/Instant Family"
1979	Fantasy Island	Boris Smolensk (uncredited)	Episode: "Baby/Marathon: Battle of the Sexes"
1980	Fantasy Island	Ozzie (uncredited)	Episode: "Eagleman/Children of Mentu"
1981	B. J. and the Bear	Football Player	Episode: "Beauties and the Beasts"
1981	Eight is Enough	Fred	Episode: "If the Glass Slipper Fits"
1983	Deadly Lessons	Craig	TV movie
1984	Single Bars, Single Women	Dolph	TV movie
1985	MacGruder and Loud	Officer Geller	Episode: "The Price of Junk"
1988	14 Going on 30	Roy 'Jackjaw' Kelton	TV movie
1990	Tales From the Crypt	Hans/Younger Carlton Webster	Episode: "The Switch"
1991	The Gambler Returns: The Luck of the Draw	Ethan Cassidy	TV movie
1991	Sons and Daughters	Spud Lincoln	13 episodes
1992	Tequila and Bonetti	T.T. Boner	Episode: "Tequila and Boner"
1993	Mad About You	Sherman Williams	Episode: "The Painter"
1994	Touched by an Angel	Marshall	Episode: "Fallen Angela"
1994-1995	ER	Dr. John 'Tag' Taglieri	11 episodes
1995	Due South	Mark Smithbauer	Episode: "The Blue Line"
1996	Murder, She Wrote	Steve Gantry	Episode: "Race to Death"
1996-1998	Pacific Blue	Lieutenant Anthony Palermo	57 Episodes
1997	Legend of the Lost Tomb	Dr. Eric Leonhardt	TV movie
1998	Mike Hammer, Private Eye	Henry Spencer	Episode: "A New Leaf: Part 2"
1999	Killer Deal	Sgt. James 'Jimmy' Quinn	TV movie
2000	Miracle in Lane 2	Myron Yoder	TV movie
2000	Chicken Soup for the Soul	Don Yaeger	TV series

=== Music videos ===
Year	Title	Artist	Notes
1988	How Can the Laboring Man Find Time for Self Culture?	Martini Ranch	Adonis
1992	Watch Me	Lorrie Morgan	Boyfriend

== Video games ==
Year	Title	Role(s)	Notes
1997	Blue Heat: The Case of the Cover Girl Murders	Sgt. Bobby Colter	Based on Cover Me
