= Patrick Levis =

American actor (born 1982)

- Born: Patrick Cannon Levis; January 23, 1982 (age 44); Accident, Maryland, U.S
- Occupations: Actor, songwriter, pastor
- Years active: 1994 – present
- Spouse: Natalie Levis (June 2009-present)
- Children: 4

Patrick Cannon Levis (born January 23, 1982) is an American former actor, best known for playing Peter in the Disney Channel Original Movie Brink!, Jack Phillips on the Disney Channel series So Weird, and Reed on The Fresh Beat Band in seasons 2 and 3. He is currently a songwriter and worship pastor.

== Biography ==
Born in Accident, Maryland on January 23, 1982, Levis grew up participating in musical theater before a subsequent career as a child actor brought him to Los Angeles, California.

He started acting in several commercials, and by the age of twelve, he had a role in the original cast of the Broadway play "Big: The Musical." After this he starred in Brink! (1998) (TV), a Disney Channel original movie, and shortly after was cast in the role of Jack Phillips in So Weird (1999). Patrick also made another Disney Channel movie with Frankie Muniz called Miracle in Lane 2 (2000) (TV) and also starred in the TV movie Inside the Osmonds (2001) (TV), where he played Donny Osmond. In 2001, Patrick was cast in the role of Grant Stage in the sitcom Maybe It's Me (2001), which aired on the WB. In 2007, he was cast to play Drew Simpson in Love's Unfolding Dream, a Hallmark Channel movie.

Levis is a Christian. He was a member of Christian progressive folk band Least of These, which he founded in 2004 with his brother and sister, who played drums and bass, respectively. In 2013, he released his solo album Extravagant God.

He has a history leading church worship and pastoring at churches across Southern California. He currently serves as a worship pastor at a church in Wildomar, California, where he resides with his wife Natalie and 4 children.

== Filmography ==
Year	Title	Role	Notes
1998	Brink!	Peter	TV movie
1999-2001	So Weird	Jack Phillips	63 episodes
2000	Miracle in Lane 2	Seth Yoder	TV movie
2001	Inside the Osmonds	Donny Osmond (older)	TV movie
2001-2002	Maybe It's Me	Grant Stage	22 episodes
2004	CSI: Crime Scene Investigation	Roger	Episode: "What's Eating Gilbert Grissom?"
2005	An American Skidrow	James	Short film
2005	The King of Queens	Brandon	Episode: "Hi, School"
2006	Road to Ramadi	1st Private Smedley	Short film
2007	Love's Unfolding Dream	Drew Simpson	TV movie
2009	Matilda	Gerald	Short film
2010-2013	The Fresh Beat Band	Reed	25 episodes
