= Miracle in Lane 2 =

- Promotional advertisement
- Written by: Joel Kauffmann; Donald C. Yost
- Directed by: Greg Beeman
- Starring: Frankie Muniz; Rick Rossovich; Molly Hagan; Patrick Levis; Roger Aaron Brown; Tuc Watkins
- Theme music composer: Phil Marshall
- Country of origin: United States
- Original language: English

Production
- Producers: Greg Beeman; Christopher Morgan
- Cinematography: William Wages
- Editor: Terry Stokes
- Running time: 89 minutes

Original release
- Network: Disney Channel
- Release: May 13, 2000

Miracle in Lane 2 is a 2000 American biographical sports drama film starring Frankie Muniz, Rick Rossovich, Molly Hagan, and Patrick Levis. The film is based on the life of Justin Yoder (portrayed by Muniz), who was the first person with a disability to compete in the All American Soapbox Derby. It was released as a Disney Channel Original Movie (DCOM).

== Plot ==
Born with spina bifida and hydrocephalus, 12-year-old Justin Yoder uses a wheelchair and lives with his overprotective parents and his athlete brother, Seth (Patrick Levis). Justin is unable to play any sports due to his disability; however, he still is determined to get a trophy of his own. For guidance, he turns to God, who takes the form of famous race car driver Bobby Wade (Tuc Watkins), who appears throughout the film.

Justin attempts to try out for the summer baseball league but is rejected due to his disability. He enters a chess tournament, but despite being placed in the younger category than his actual age due to assumptions about him using a wheelchair, he loses the tournament.

After leaving the tournament disappointed, Justin finds himself at a car show where he sees his neighbor, Vic Sauder (Roger Aaron Brown), who is attending with his vintage red Corvette. Justin assists Vic in winning the contest for best car in exchange for the associated trophy. Vic stops by to deliver the trophy but leaves when he is informed Justin is not there. Justin visits Vic’s home and when there is no response, Justin enters the garage and attempts to retrieve the trophy from a high shelf. The attempt causes the shelf to fall, landing on the prized Corvette, and damaging the car.

Justin helps Vic clean the garage as punishment and the two develop a bond, however, Vic does not allow Justin to go near the shed on the property. Despite the warning, when Vic is running errands, Justin looks through the windows of the shed and sees multiple trophies inside. He enters and discovers more awards along with a soapbox racer. He starts a projector that plays a film of a young girl competing in a soapbox racer, however, he is caught by Vic who demands that he leave.

After reconciling with Vic and attending a soapbox race together, Justin, his father, and Vic build a soapbox racer. To accommodate his disability, his father and Vic build a customized handbrake that they name the "Justin Brake”. Meanwhile, Seth feels ignored by his father who consistently misses his baseball games and is revealed to be in therapy during a fight with Justin.

During a race, Justin crashes and is hospitalized due to spinal fluid buildup. He is permitted to race in the All American Soapbox Derby after the winning competitor of the penultimate race drops out. On their way to the derby, Vic reveals to Justin that his daughter, Becca, who was also a soapbox racer competitor, died in a swimming accident and his wife died a year afterward. Seth convinces the Rules Committee to allow Justin to compete with a handbrake rather than the regulation foot brake after contacting the media, leading to the brothers' reconciliation. Justin ultimately wins the tournament.

In the final scene, Justin asks God if people are perfect when they go to Heaven. In response, God shows him a vision where there are angels with and without wheelchairs to which he happily replies "Perfect".

As a tribute to Justin, live footage of him is shown before the closing credits.

== Cast ==
- Frankie Muniz as Justin Yoder
- Rick Rossovich as Myron Yoder
- Molly Hagan as Sheila Yoder
- Patrick Levis as Seth Yoder
- Roger Aaron Brown as Vic Sauder
- Tuc Watkins as God / Bobby Wade
- Brittany Bouck as Cindy
- Todd Hurst as Brad
- Kara Keough as Teresa
- Joel McKinnon Miller as Bill
- Holmes Osborne as Randall
- Freda Foh Shen as Dr. Kwan
- Christian Copelin as Pipsqueak
- Rick Fitts as Soccer Coach
- Jim Jansen as Minister
- James Lashly as Leather Jacket Man
- Tom Nolan as Baseball Coach
- Milt Tarver as Elder Statesman
- Tom Virtue as The Announcer
- Ethan Cutuli as Racer / Fan
- Asha Moore as Rebecca

== Production ==
Originally known as Wheelies, the telefilm was in production in March 2000 for a May 2000 Disney Channel premiere.

== Awards ==
=== Won ===
- Directors Guild of America, 2001: DGA Award, Outstanding Directorial Achievement in Children's Programs

Greg Beeman (director), Christopher Morgan (unit production manager) (plaque), Lisa C. Satriano (first assistant director) (plaque), Nick Satriano (second assistant director) (plaque)

- Humanitas Prize, 2001 - Children's Live-Action Category, Joel Kauffmann, Donald C. Yost
- Young Artist Awards, 2001 - Young Artist Award Best Performance in a TV Movie (Drama), Supporting Young Actor, Patrick Levis

=== Nominations ===
- Writers Guild of America, 2001 - WGA Award (TV) Children's Script, Joel Kauffmann, Donald C. Yost
- Young Artist Award - Best Family TV Movie/Pilot/Mini-Series - Cable
- Young Artist Award - Best Performance in a TV Movie (Drama), Leading Young Actor, Frankie Muniz
