= A Minute with Stan Hooper =

American sitcom

- Also known as: Stan Hooper
- Genre: Sitcom
- Created by: Norm Macdonald; Barry Kemp
- Written by: Norm Macdonald; Cindy Caponera; Barry Kemp; Mike Lisbe; Nate Reger; Joseph Staretski; Alain de Leonardis
- Directed by: Jeffrey L. Melman; Barry Kemp
- Starring: Norm Macdonald; Penelope Ann Miller; Reagan Dale Neis
- Composer: Jason Miller
- Country of origin: United States
- Original language: English
- No. of seasons: 1
- No. of episodes: 13

Production
- Executive producers: Norm Macdonald; Barry Kemp; Lori Jo Hoekstra
- Producer: Jessie Ward Dugan
- Running time: 30 minutes
- Production companies: Bungalow 78 Productions; Paramount Television

Original release
- Network: Fox
- Release: October 29 – December 12, 2003

A Minute with Stan Hooper, also known as Stan Hooper, is an American sitcom starring Norm Macdonald. The series was a Bungalow 78 production in association with Paramount Television and aired on Fox. The series was canceled after eight of the thirteen episodes produced were aired.

The central character's name, Stan Hooper, was taken from Macdonald's work on Saturday Night Live, but the characters were vastly different. The role also allowed Macdonald to play the straight man among a cast of eccentric characters, a departure from his traditional comedy style.

== Plot ==
Hooper, a famous newspaper columnist turned television commentator, moves his family from their New York home to a small Wisconsin town, Waterford Falls, where he hopes to better get in touch with Middle America in an attempt to make his weekly minute-long television commentaries more appealing to a larger audience. While there, he interacts with the folksy, and largely strange, townspeople of Waterford Falls.

Macdonald has said his goal was for the show to lull its audience into complacency, and become more subversive as time went on. It included a plan for Stan's wife Molly to be murdered by a drifter at the end of the first season. The show was cancelled before any such plans were enacted.

== Cast ==
- Norm Macdonald as Stan Hooper
- Penelope Ann Miller as Molly Hooper
- Brian Howe as Gary
- Garret Dillahunt as Lou Peterson
- Eric Lively as Ryan Hawkins
- Reagan Dale Neis as Chelsea
- Daniel Roebuck as Pete Peterson
- Fred Willard as Fred Hawkins

== Episodes ==
No.	Title	Directed by	Written by	Original release date	Prod. code
1	"Pilot"	Barry Kemp	Barry Kemp & Norm Macdonald	October 29, 2003	101
Stan moves with his family from New York to a small Wisconsin town, Waterford Falls, in order to better get in touch with "Middle America" to make his minute-long television commentaries more appealing to a larger audience.
2	"Stan Goes to Washington"	Jeff Melman	Cindy Caponera	November 5, 2003	104
After he finds out that the same man has been mayor for five straight terms, Stan decides to run for town mayor to give the townsfolk another choice. However, Stan is shocked to learn of the cover-up behind the mayor and the involvement of Fred Hawkins in it, as well as the rest of the town.
3	"The Hustle"	Jeff Melman	Norm Macdonald & Barry Kemp	November 12, 2003	102
After deciding to go out for a boys' night out at Jimmy's tavern with Lou and Pete Peterson, Stan is accused of using trick shots whenever he sinks a ball during a game of billiards for "dimes" and "nickels". When Stan discovers that "dimes" and "nickels" are worth much more than he thought, Stan tries to save his opponent, Lou, from selling the diner. Meanwhile, Garry invites Molly to join him and the girls at their weekly bridge game at the Hooper residence. Ryan and Chelsea ask Stan for advice on planning their future while Chelsea contemplates her opportunities at a Cosmetics and Tattoo college.
4	"An Old Fashioned Thanksgiving"	Jeff Melman	Mike Lisbe & Nate Reger	November 19, 2003	106
Stan gets interested in turkey hunting, ordering everything on the menu in preparation for an outing. Stan then enlists Chelsea's help in preventing Molly from cooking anything for Thanksgiving.
5	"Bye, Bye, Miss American Pie"	Jeff Melman	Story by : Josh Gardner; Teleplay by : Josh Gardner & Sid Youngers	November 26, 2003	109
Fred's frustration peaks because Gary has invited Molly and Chelsea to join the guys-only Christmas carolling group, "The Silent Knights". Meanwhile, when the diner runs out of Clara Meek's apple pie (Stan's favourite), Stan tries his best in getting the recipe from the ailing Clara before she dies.
6	"Fear Finds the Falls"	Jeff Melman	Joseph Staretski	December 3, 2003	107
To prove that the town isn't inviolable to crime, Stan burgles the diner.
7	"Stan's Biggest Fan"	Jeff Melman	Judd Pillot & John Peaslee	December 12, 2003	105
Stan discovers that his favourite fan lives nearby and gets the help of a cranky mailman to find him.
8	"Good Golly, Miss Molly"	John Larroquette	Barry Kemp & Norm Macdonald	December 12, 2003	103
A typo in the 'Cheese Quarterly' naming Molly as Fred's mistress brings the town's press down on Stan.
9	"Snow Job"	Jeff Melman	John Peaslee & Judd Pillot	Unaired	108
The town's snowplough operator has a thing for Stan, but when Stan denies her, the whole town suffers.
10	"Ghost Family"	Jeff Melman	Nate Reger & Sid Youngers	Unaired	110
After learning that his boathouse is supposedly haunted, Stan investigates his property's past.
11	"The Milkman"	Jeff Melman	Charlie Bonomo	Unaired	111
After inadvertently getting the milkman fired, Stan helps him start his own "business".
12	"The Good Doctor"	Jeff Melman	Sid Youngers	Unaired	112
Stan suspects that the town's doctor, Doc Goodman, isn't really a doctor.
13	"Stan's Best Friend"	Jeff Melman	Miriam Trogdon	Unaired	113
Problems arise after Stan mistakes a wolf that he found to be a cute puppy.

== International broadcasters ==
In Australia, the entire series aired in late-night timeslots on Network Ten.
