= Artworks (film) =

- Directed by: Jim Amatulli
- Written by: Jim Amatulli; Lee Watters
- Produced by: Jim Amatulli; Steven C. Beer
- Starring: Virginia Madsen; Rick Rossovich; Eddie Mills; Daniel von Bargen
- Cinematography: Jeff Barklage
- Edited by: Howard Heard
- Music by: Patrick Kelly
- Release date: April 10, 2003 (WorldFest Houston)
- Running time: 93 minutes
- Country: United States
- Language: English

Artworks is a 2003 crime film directed by Jim Amatulli and starring Virginia Madsen, Rick Rossovich, Eddie Mills, and Daniel von Bargen.

== Premise ==
A police chief's daughter, in home security sales, contacts an art gallery possessor. They love art and despise their clients' motives for gathering artworks. They think of a plot to steal overlooked but valuable artworks from her affluent clients' homes.

== Cast ==
- Virginia Madsen as Emma Becker
- Rick Rossovich as Brett Rogers
- Eddie Mills as Cory
- Daniel von Bargen as Howard Deardorf, Emma's father
- Matt Miller as Bill
- Denise Dal Vera as Katie Landon
- Jefferson Moore as Tuck Landon
- Sally Noble Hager as Mrs. Palarski
- Jane Mowder as Detective Hubbard
