= Maybe It's Me (TV series) =

- Genre: Sitcom
- Created by: Suzanne Martin
- Starring: Julia Sweeney; Reagan Dale Neis; Patrick Levis; Ellen Albertini Dow; Andrew Walker; Daniella Canterman; Deanna Canterman; Walter Marsh; Dabbs Greer; Vicki Davis; Shaun Sipos; Fred Willard
- Opening theme: "Everything U R" by Lindsay Pagano (first half of series); "I'd Do Anything" by Simple Plan (remainder of series)
- Composer: Wendy Blackstone
- Country of origin: United States
- Original language: English
- No. of seasons: 1
- No. of episodes: 22

Production
- Executive producers: Suzanne Martin; Jeff Martin; Jay Daniel
- Producers: Susan Nirah Jaffee; Tony Brown
- Camera setup: Single-camera
- Running time: 22 minutes
- Production companies: SamJen Productions; Touchstone Television; Warner Bros. Television

Original release
- Network: The WB
- Release: October 5, 2001 – May 3, 2002

Maybe It's Me is an American television sitcom that aired on The WB network. It premiered on October 5, 2001, and ended on May 3, 2002. The series was created and executive produced by Suzanne Martin, a former writer of Frasier and Ellen.

== Premise ==
The series was centered on the life of teenager Molly Stage (Reagan Dale Neis) and her eccentric and often-embarrassing family, including her parents (insanely frugal mom, played by Julia Sweeney, and soccer-obsessed dad, played by Fred Willard), her two older brothers, her younger twin sisters, and her grandparents.

Over the course of the series, Molly dealt with many situations in which her family embarrassed her on numerous occasions. Not alone in her perils, she had her best friend Mia (Vicki Davis) by her side who is madly in love with Molly's older brother Grant (Patrick Levis), who is a born-again Christian. Her oldest, self-absorbed brother Rick (Andrew W. Walker) constantly got into trouble.

== Original series title ==
During the network's upfront presentation that season, the show was originally titled Maybe I'm Adopted, but following negative feedback, the show was re-titled. The show was unique in that it featured pop-up graphics on the screen, a concept originally proposed by Stan Rogow for another Disney-produced comedy series, Lizzie McGuire.

== Cast ==
=== Main ===
- Reagan Dale Neis as Molly Stage
- Julia Sweeney as Mary Stage, Molly's mother
- Patrick Levis as Grant Stage, Molly's older brother
- Ellen Albertini Dow as Harriet Krupp, Mary's mother and Molly's maternal grandmother
- Andrew Walker as Rick Stage, Molly's older brother
- Daniella Canterman as Mindy Stage, Molly's younger sister and Cindy's identical twin sister
- Deanna Canterman as Cindy Stage, Molly's younger sister and Mindy's identical twin sister
- Walter Marsh (pilot) & Dabbs Greer as Fred Stage, Jerry's father and Molly's paternal grandfather (22 episodes)
- Vicki Davis as Mia, Molly's best friend
- Shaun Sipos (pilot) as Nick Gibson, Molly's boyfriend (8 episodes)
- Fred Willard as Jerry Stage, Molly's father

=== Recurring ===
- Noah Bastian as Ben (6 episodes)

== Episodes ==
No.	Title	Directed by	Written by	Original release date	Prod. code	Viewers (millions)
1	"The Pilot Episode"	Bryan Gordon	Suzanne Martin	October 5, 2001	475347	3.68
Molly flirts with a handsome classmate and becomes very upset, when Mary invites him for dinner.
2	"The "Hair" Episode"	Lev L. Spiro	Ellen Byron & Lissa Kapstrom	October 12, 2001	227502	2.7
Molly is mortified to learn that her parents are planning to appear in a local theater production of "Hair", which may include a nude scene. Meanwhile, Fred is upset over Harriet's attraction to his best friend.
3	"The Cheerleader Episode"	Danny Leiner	Jeff Martin & Suzanne Martin	October 19, 2001	227504	3.06
Molly joins the school's cheerleading squad to be closer to Nick. Meanwhile, Jerry and Rick grow mustaches to impress women.
4	"The Halloween Episode"	Lev L. Spiro	Ellen Byron & Lissa Kapstrom	October 26, 2001	227505	2.5
Molly must deal with a broken heart on Halloween and seeks comfort from her family, who rather go all out for the holiday instead.
5	"The Birthday Episode"	Bryan Gordon	Jillian Tohber	November 2, 2001	227503	3.70
Molly celebrates her 16th birthday and endures her family's bizarre rituals, which include peculiar songs and a seafood dinner at the same restaurant where cool kids from Molly's school are hanging out.
6	"The Magic CD Episode"	Bryan Gordon	Ben Kull	November 9, 2001	227506	3.94
Molly finds a discarded CD with an eclectic mix of love songs on it, and she sets out to find the person who recorded it.
7	"The Mini-Jerry Episode"	Peter Werner	Susan Nirah Jaffee	November 16, 2001	227508	2.9
Jerry sets Molly up with a high-school senior who works in his office and has nearly the same personality traits as her dad.
8	"The Exchange-Student Episode"	Bryan Gordon	Jeff Martin & Suzanne Martin	December 7, 2001	227501	2.59
Jerry agrees to house an exchange student from Brazil after learning that the girl plays on her country's Olympic soccer team. Meanwhile, Molly is upset that she cannot go to a party with Nick because it's scheduled for the same night as a piano recital by the twins.
9	"The Lunch Lady Episode"	Jamie Babbit	Ellen Byron & Lissa Kapstrom	December 14, 2001	227510	3.83
Molly suggests that Mary get a new job to shake up things in her life. But things take a wrong turn when the new job is a lunch lady at Molly's school. Meanwhile, Rick is depressed after an attractive woman turns him down for a date.
10	"The Romeo & Juliet Episode"	Michael Katleman	Susan Nirah Jaffee	January 11, 2002	227512	3.47
Molly meets a cute guy outside her father's office, but soon discovers that the boy is the son of Jerry's business rival, a laser eye surgeon. Meanwhile, an attractive department-store clerk shows an interest in Grant, despite Rick's attempts to woo her.
11	"The Snow Day Episode"	Lev L. Spiro	Ellen Byron & Lissa Kapstrom	January 18, 2002	227513	3.0
Molly and Grant clean out the attic during a day off from school and accidentally spill paint on their mother's wedding dress; Rick baby-sits the twins in their room, where they force their brother to participate in a humiliating tea party.
12	"The Dutch Heritage Episode"	Bryan Gordon	Jeff Martin & Suzanne Martin	February 1, 2002	227514	2.91
Molly wins a chance to compete for a Dutch heritage scholarship for college, only to learn that her family is not really Dutch. Meanwhile, Grant has trouble sleeping because of recurring romantic dreams about Mia.
13	"The Fever Episode"	Tom Moore	Ben Kull	February 15, 2002	227511	2.4
Jerry decides to build a boat and he enlists his family's help, but Rick is left with most of the work. Meanwhile, Molly bonds with the family of a guy she wants to date.
14	"The Wedding and a Funeral Episode"	Jamie Babbit	Jeff Martin & Suzanne Martin	February 22, 2002	227516	2.22
Harriet asks her family to stage a funeral for her and requests that her niece Tillie (Naomi Judd) be allowed to attend, despite a rift that exists between Tillie and Mary. While Molly arranges the gathering, Rick struggles with the eulogy his grandmother asked him to write.
15	"The Video Episode"	Danny Leiner	Susan Nirah Jaffee	March 15, 2002	227515	3.21
When Molly decides to run for student-body president, she casts Grant in a music video announcing her candidacy. But Grant's appearance in the video proves to be so popular, everyone in school thinks that he is actually the one running for the position.
16	"The Baby Episode"	Peter Lauer	Susan Nirah Jaffee	March 22, 2002	227519	3.61
A baby is left in a bassinet on the Stages' porch with a note written by the mother claiming that Rick is the child's father. While Rick tries to find the woman, Molly is stuck caring for the infant and the twins compete with the new arrival for their parents' attention.
17	"The Crazy-Girl Episode"	Jamie Babbit	Susan Nirah Jaffee	March 29, 2002	227507	2.70
Molly discovers that the Stages are not the only wacky family in town. She meets the Finns (Susan Ruttan and Howard Hesseman), a family that believes in the philosophy "If you don't feel like it, you don't have to do it".
18	"The Lab Partner Episode"	Michael Lange	Ellen Byron & Lissa Kapstrom	April 5, 2002	227509	2.34
Molly's new lab partner in science class is Nick's current girlfriend, with whom Molly soon bonds after Nick dumps the popular girl. Meanwhile, Jerry arranges to take Mary to a swing-club outing to celebrate their anniversary, not realizing that it's not a dance group but rather a spouse-swapping party.
19	"The Rick's in Love Episode"	Peter Werner	Ellen Byron & Lissa Kapstrom	April 12, 2002	227517	3.22
Molly teaches Rick how to be sensitive when he starts dating a new girl. Meanwhile, Mary is obsessed with documenting her mother's past.
20	"The Quahog Festival Episode"	Lev L. Spiro	Phil Baker & Drew Vaupen	April 19, 2002	227518	3.07
Mary enters Molly into the town's yearly Quahog Festival Pageant, which Molly does not even want to participate in until the reigning mother and daughter winning team The Kimberlys (Morgan Fairchild and Keri Lynn Pratt) say hurtful words about Mary. Meanwhile, Jerry recruits Grant to help him build a float for the festival's parade.
21	"The Prom Episode" (Part 1)	Bryan Gordon	Ellen Byron & Lissa Kapstrom	April 26, 2002	227520	2.49
Molly develops feelings for her friend Ben (Noah Bastian) and she considers asking him to the prom. Meanwhile, Rick learns that his name is on the deed to the Stage home and he inadvertently loses the property in a card game.
22	"The Prom Episode" (Part 2)	Michael Katleman	Yolanda Ferraloro	May 3, 2002	227521	3.09
Molly prepares to attend the prom with Ben, but Rick loses the deed to the house to Tony Dirico (John Caponera) and must date Tony's nerdy son, Forest (Samm Levine) in order to get the house back.
