= Reagan Dale Neis =

Canadian actress (born 1976)

- Born: September 24, 1976 (age 49); Portage la Prairie, Manitoba, Canada
- Occupations: Actress, film producer
- Years active: 1998–2012, 2016-present

Reagan Dale Neis (born September 24, 1976) is a Canadian actress. She is best known for her lead role in The WB sitcom Maybe It's Me and co-starring in the Fox sitcom A Minute with Stan Hooper. She has also guest-starred on Joey and Malcolm in the Middle and co-starred in the 2006 film Material Girls.

== Biography ==
Born in Portage la Prairie, Manitoba, Neis grew up in Red Deer, Alberta. Neis graduated from the Lindsay Thurber Comprehensive High School. Between high school and college, she took a year off, working as a waitress. She then went to Red Deer College, where she studied theatre.

== Work ==
Neis's first acting role on film was in the movie Naked Frailties (1998), where she played the lead female role. Next, Neis played the main character, Molly Stage, in Maybe It's Me.

Prior to playing Molly Stage, she had done small television roles, including appearing in Malcolm in the Middle as Malcolm's love interest Nikki. The New Zealand Herald wrote that "Canadian actress Reagan Dale Neis is extremely likeable as Molly Stage." Her last known acting credit was in 2016.

== Filmography ==
| Year | Title | Role | Notes |
|---|---|---|---|
| 1998 | Naked Frailties | Liz | |
| 2001 | Go Fish | Staci | 1 episode: "Go Four-Point Plan" |
| 2001 | Maybe It's Me | Molly Stage | 22 episodes (2001–2002) |
| 2001 | Malcolm in the Middle | Laura | 1 episode: "Evacuation" |
| 2002 | Stark Raving Mad | Kitten | Video |
| 2002 | Malcolm in the Middle | Nikki | 1 episode: "Forbidden Girlfriend" |
| 2003 | Malcolm in the Middle | Nikki | 3 episodes: "Malcolm Holds His Tongue"; "Long Drive"; "Kicked Out" |
| 2003 | A Minute with Stan Hooper | Chelsea | 13 episodes (2003–2004) |
| 2004 | Stolen Poem | Carol | |
| 2004 | Joey | Jane | 1 episode: "Joey and the Book Club" |
| 2006 | Dirty Habit | Amelia | |
| 2006 | Material Girls | Jaden | |
| 2009 | Camera Obscura | Clara | |

== Awards and nominations ==
| Year | Award | Category | Title of work | Result |
|---|---|---|---|---|
| 1999 | Rosie Award | Best Lead Performance - Female | Naked Frailties | Nominated |
