= Justin Yoder =

American soapbox racer (1986–2024)

- Born: November 9, 1986; Middlebury, Indiana, U.S.
- Died: September 15, 2024 (aged 37); Fort Wayne, Indiana, U.S.
- Spouse: Stephanie Yoder
- Parent(s): Myron (father); Sheila (mother)
- Relatives: Seth (brother)

Justin Ross Yoder (November 9, 1986 – September 15, 2024) was an American soapbox racer. He was the first child with a disability to drive a soapbox in the All American Soapbox Derby. In 1996, he challenged the regulations to allow children with disabilities to use a hand brake instead of the required foot brake. Thanks to him, regulations were changed. The hand brake is now called the Justin Brake in his honor.

Yoder had spina bifida and hydrocephalus. His story is told in the film Miracle in Lane 2, starring Frankie Muniz.

Yoder was a Mennonite and attended the same church as the film's screenwriters Don Yost and Joel Kauffmann.

Yoder was a student at Goshen College in Goshen, Indiana, and majored in American Sign Language Interpreting.

Yoder was involved in a serious car collision on September 14, 2024, after another driver being pursued by police at high speed struck the vehicle in which Yoder was riding. He died the following day from his injuries, at the age of 37.
