= Cover Me (film) =

- Directed by: Michael Schroeder
- Written by: Steve Johnson
- Produced by: Brad Krevoy; Steven Stabler
- Starring: Rick Rossovich; Courtney Taylor; Paul Sorvino; Stephen Nichols; Elliott Gould; Corbin Bernsen
- Production company: Motion Picture Corporation of America
- Distributed by: Paramount Home Video
- Release date: October 10, 1995 (U.S. video)
- Running time: 94 minutes
- Country: United States
- Language: English

Cover Me is a 1995 direct-to-video erotic thriller film starring Rick Rossovich, Courtney Taylor, Paul Sorvino, Stephen Nichols, Elliott Gould and Corbin Bernsen. It was produced in conjunction with the Orion Interactive CD-ROM game Blue Heat: The Case of the Cover Girl Murders.

== Plot ==
A former policewoman disguises herself as a nude model to try and stop a serial killer preying on the models of a Los Angeles adult magazine.

== Cast ==
- Rick Rossovich as Sergeant Bobby Colter
- Courtney Taylor as Holly Jacobson
- Paul Sorvino as J J Davis
- Stephen Nichols as Dimitri
- Elliott Gould as Captain Richards
- Corbin Bernsen as Andre Solloway
- Frank Medrano as Eddie Agajan
- Betsy Monroe as Lakey Snow
- Shae Marks as Candy Jefferson
- Rob Steinberg as Logan Collins
- Nicole Hansen as Amy Thomas
- Cynthia Harrison as Polly Forbes
- Marc Poppel as Ponytail
- Julie Cialini as Waitress
- Leslie Ryan as Hostess

== Critical reception ==
Entertainment Weekly wrote in its review, "Cover Me may derive most of its entertainment value from its sincere ludicrousness, but there are also the predictable film debuts of various Playboy centerfolds, plus token cameos by the likes of Corbin Bernsen."
