= Blue Heat: The Case of the Cover Girl Murders =

1997 video game

- Cover art
- Developer: Quarium Inc.
- Publisher: Orion Interactive
- Directors: Jed Weintrob; Craig Shapiro
- Producers: Brad Krevoy; Steven Stabler; Jed Weintrob
- Programmer: Bart J. Besseling
- Writers: Andrew Osborne; Craig Shapiro
- Platforms: Windows, Windows 3.x
- Release: September 12, 1997
- Genre: Adventure
- Mode: Single-player

Blue Heat: The Case of the Cover Girl Murders (a.k.a. "Blue Heat") is a 1997 Windows game developed by Quarium Inc. and published by Orion Interactive. It was based on the 1995 film Cover Me.

== Plot ==
LAPD Detective Holly Jacobson goes undercover to find a serial killer who is murdering model girls who featured in the LA Erotica Magazine.

== Gameplay ==
The game uses a simple point and click interface without any menus. Clicking on particular items allows the player to examine them closer. When the player clicks an exit door, the game goes to an overview map of Los Angeles. The player may only travel to locations relevant to the case. As the player examines evidence, more options and locations become available.

== Development ==
Cyberdreams was to be the original publisher, but closed down before they could publish it, so they made an agreement with Orion Interactive to do the publishing.

== Reception ==
Reception

Review score
Publication	Score
Metzomagic	3/5
