= Frankie Muniz =

American actor and racing driver (born 1985)

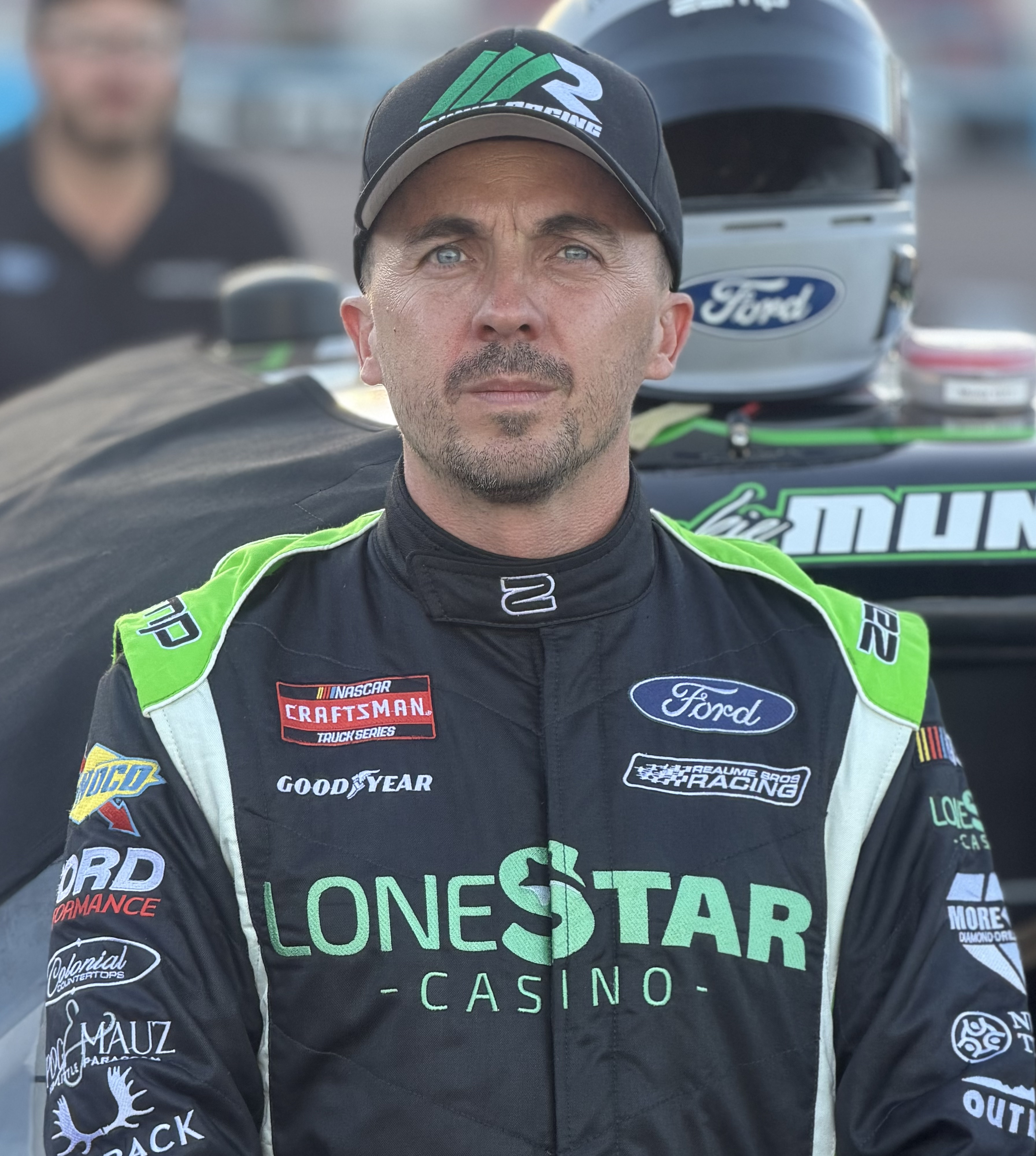
- Muniz at Phoenix Raceway in 2025
- Born: Francisco James Muniz IV; December 5, 1985 (age 40); Wood-Ridge, New Jersey, U.S.
- Occupations: Actor; racing driver
- Years active: 1997–present
- Spouse: Paige Price (m. 2019; sep. 2026)
- Children: 1

Atlantic Championship
- Categorisation: FIA Bronze
- Years active: 2007–2009
- Teams: Jensen MotorSport, Pacific Coast Motorsports, Team Stargate Worlds
- Starts: 32
- Wins: 0
- Poles: 0
- Fastest laps: 1
- Best finish: 9th in 2009

Championship titles
- 2026: 2026 GT4 America Series Amateur Class Championship

Awards
- 2005: Toyota Pro/Celebrity Race Celebrity Winner

NASCAR O'Reilly Auto Parts Series career
- 2 races run over 1 year
- 2024 position: 105th
- Best finish: 105th (2024)
- First race: 2024 United Rentals 300 (Daytona)
- Last race: 2024 Call811.com Every Dig. Every Time. 200 (Phoenix)
Wins	Top tens	Poles
0	0	0

NASCAR FedEx Freight Truck Series career
- 46 races run over 3 years
- Truck no., team: No. 33 (Team Reaume)
- 2026 position: 25th
- Best finish: 25th (2026)
- First race: 2024 Rackley Roofing 200 (Nashville)
- Last race: 2026 Craftsman 200 (Homestead)
Wins	Top tens	Poles
0	1	0

ARCA Menards Series career
- 22 races run over 2 years
- Best finish: 4th (2023)
- First race: 2023 BRANDT 200 (Daytona)
- Last race: 2024 Henry Ford Health 200 (Michigan)
Wins	Top tens	Poles
0	12	0

ARCA Menards Series East career
- 4 races run over 1 year
- Best finish: 15th (2023)
- First race: 2023 Calypso Lemonade 150 (Iowa)
- Last race: 2023 Bush's Beans 200 (Bristol)
Wins	Top tens	Poles
0	1	0

ARCA Menards Series West career
- 1 race run over 1 year
- Best finish: 41st (2023)
- First race: 2023 General Tire 150 (Phoenix)
Wins	Top tens	Poles
0	1	0
- Statistics up to date as of November 6, 2026.

Francisco Muniz IV (/ˈmjuːnɪz/; born December 5, 1985) is an American actor and racing driver. Muniz came to prominence in the 2000s playing the eponymous character of the Fox sitcom Malcolm in the Middle (2000–2006), for which he was nominated for an Emmy and two Golden Globe Awards. He also worked in the films Big Fat Liar (2002), Deuces Wild (2002), Agent Cody Banks (2003), and Racing Stripes (2005). At the height of his fame in 2003, Muniz was considered one of the most popular child actors and "one of Hollywood's most bankable teens".

In 2008, Muniz put his acting career on hold to pursue an open-wheel racing career and competed in the Atlantic Championship. He returned to racing in 2021 in stock cars, joining Rette Jones Racing for a full season in the ARCA Menards Series in 2023, where he finished fourth in the standings. He competes full-time in the NASCAR Craftsman Truck Series, driving the No. 33 Ford F-150 for Team Reaume.

== Early life ==
Francisco Muniz IV was born in Wood-Ridge, New Jersey, on December 5, 1985, the son of nurse Denise and restaurateur Francisco Muñiz III. Muniz's mother is half Irish and half Italian, while his father is Puerto Rican (of Spanish descent from Asturias). He has an older sister named Cristina.

When Muniz was four years old, his family moved to Knightdale, North Carolina, where he grew up. He was discovered at the age of eight at a talent show in Raleigh, North Carolina, playing Tiny Tim in a local production of A Christmas Carol. His parents divorced shortly after, and he subsequently moved with his mother to Burbank, California. Beginning in the sixth grade, he was homeschooled by his mother.

== Career ==
=== Acting ===
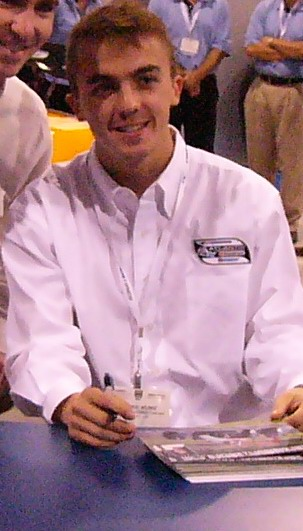
Muniz in 2007

Muniz appeared in commercials and made his film debut in the made-for-television movie To Dance with Olivia (1997), starring Lou Gossett Jr. In that same year, he appeared in the CBS Hallmark Hall of Fame presentation of What the Deaf Man Heard. A small role in the film Lost & Found (1999) led to his breakout role as the titular character on Linwood Boomer's sitcom Malcolm in the Middle, which premiered on Fox on January 9, 2000. The show was successful, and it was quickly met with accolades. The pilot episode was watched by 23 million people and the second episode, "Red Dress" (premiered on January 16, 2000), by 26 million. He was nominated for an Emmy Award in 2001, and received The Hollywood Reporter "Young Star Award" for his work in the series.

Throughout his television career, Muniz made guest appearances on the shows Lizzie McGuire; Sabrina, the Teenage Witch; and MADtv. His first starring role was as Willie Morris in the 2000 family drama film My Dog Skip, which was released at the same approximate time as the pilot for Malcolm in the Middle. That same year, he provided the character voice of Domino in the 2000 video game 102 Dalmatians: Puppies to the Rescue and was featured on the video game Stargate Worlds.

The following year, he contributed a character voice to the animal cast of the film Dr. Dolittle 2. Muniz was also the voice of Chester McBadBat in the first two seasons of The Fairly OddParents until Jason Marsden took over. He had a hit with the 2002 release Big Fat Liar, in which he co-starred with teen actress Amanda Bynes as a pair of students seeking revenge on a sleazy movie producer (played by Paul Giamatti). Muniz was also part of the ensemble for the gang film Deuces Wild, released that same year. In 2003, he made a cameo appearance as Cher's underage boyfriend in Stuck on You. That same year, he appeared in the series premiere of Ashton Kutcher's MTV practical joke series Punk'd.

Muniz subsequently was cast in the lead role in Holes, but ultimately dropped out to play the title role in the film Agent Cody Banks, a role which he would reprise in its sequel, Agent Cody Banks 2: Destination London. The first film was a success when it opened in March 2003, grossing $47 million; the sequel came out a year later and was a failure, only grossing $28 million. He trained in martial arts for the films and performed most of his own stunts. He also commented that it was the point in his career where he should "make the transition from child actor to an adult actor or a respectable actor." In 2004, he wrote the teleplay of the TV show Granted, on which he was also the executive producer.

Muniz provided the character voice of a zebra named Stripes, who wishes to become a racing equine, in the 2005 film Racing Stripes. That same year, he made a guest appearance as himself in "Mr. F", an episode of the Fox comedy Arrested Development. In April 2006, he began filming My Sexiest Year, an independent film in which Harvey Keitel played his father. He announced, during that same month, that he would be taking a break from acting, in order to pursue a career in race car driving, under a full-time two-year deal with Jensen Motorsport in the Formula BMW competition. In 2006, he was executive producer for the movie Choose Your Own Adventure: The Abominable Snowman.

Malcolm in the Middle finished its run on May 14, 2006. He expressed a desire to leave traditional Hollywood film roles behind, saying: "Growing up has never scared me until last year. I started thinking about getting older, being an adult, and it scared me. Hopefully things will work out in my career. If they don't, then it was never meant to be."

Despite his earlier stated intention to take a break from acting, Muniz was reported in May 2006 to have signed on to star in the R-rated teen-sex comedy Extreme Movie. The film was originally planned to be released in 2007 by Dimension Films, but was ultimately released straight to DVD in February 2009. In 2007, he became an associate producer of the film Choose Connor. In late 2007, he made a guest appearance in an episode of the CBS crime drama Criminal Minds. In December 2007, he made a cameo appearance in the movie Walk Hard: The Dewey Cox Story, playing Buddy Holly. In 2008, he began work on a film with former Missy Elliott protégée Brianna Perry, but the project was never released.

Muniz made a foray into the superhero genre with the family action film Pizza Man, in 2011. In 2012, he made a cameo appearance as himself in the second season of the comedy Don't Trust the B— in Apartment 23. In 2015, he made another cameo appearance as a fictionalized version of himself in The Mysteries of Laura, in which Detective Merideth Bose (Janina Gavankar) has a crush on an actor/racecar driver (Muniz) who was competing in a drag race. The team was on an NYPD case, and suspected evidence would present itself at the drag race.

In 2021, Muniz was a guest star in an episode of ABC's The Rookie. He played a former child actor who had become a cult leader, in an apparent parody of his former teen idol status. On December 21, 2023, he starred with Kelly Elizabeth Lawera and Kyle Fecteau in Santa's Training Camp/Ford Performance. In December 2024, it was announced that Muniz had reprised his role as Malcolm in a four episode Malcolm in the Middle reboot for Disney+, alongside fellow original cast members Bryan Cranston and Jane Kaczmarek. The show was initially pitched as a 2 hour movie, before altering to four 30 minute episodes. Filming commenced in April 2025, with production working around Muniz' NASCAR schedule. Filming wrapped in May 2025.

=== Racing ===
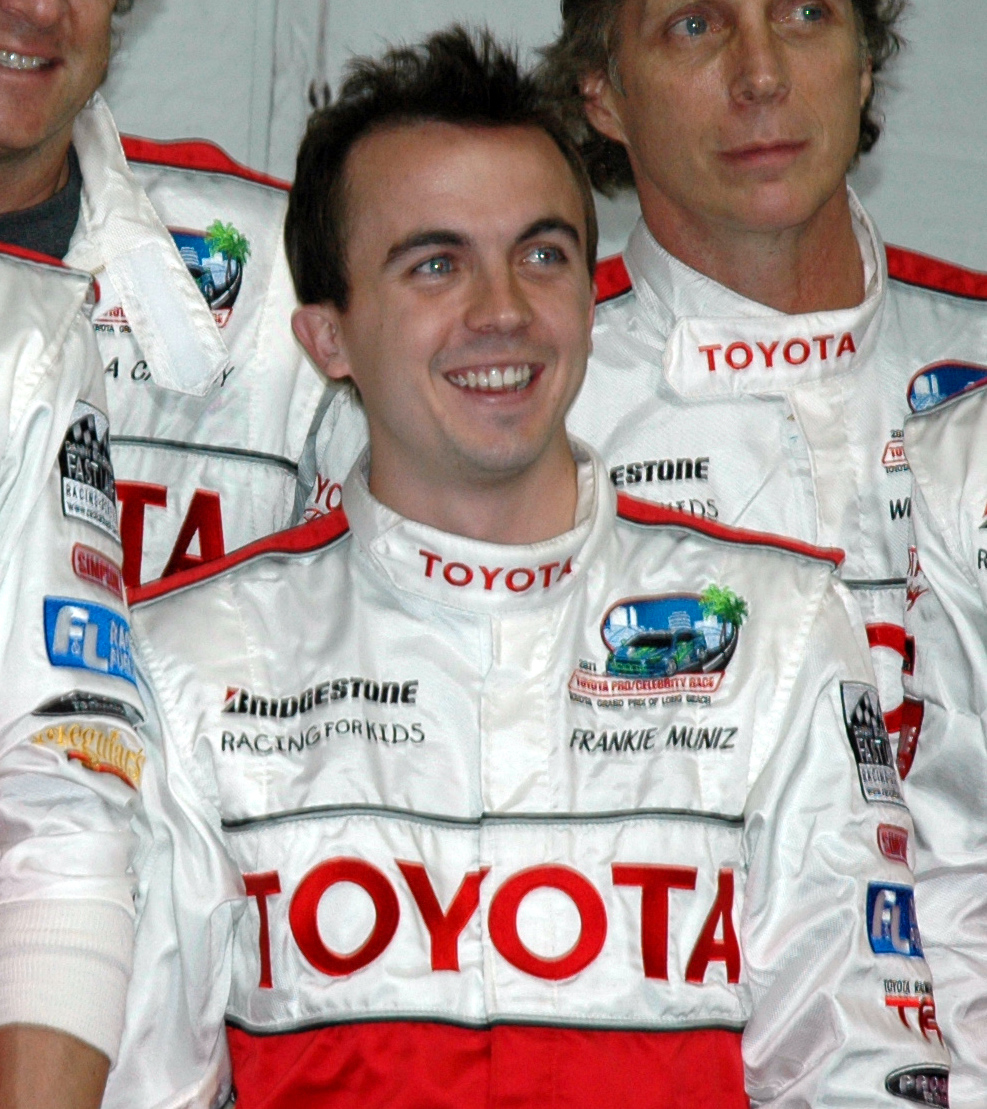
Muniz at the Toyota Pro/Celebrity Race in 2011

Muniz has had a long-running interest in car racing. On February 18, 2001, Muniz drove the pace car for the Daytona 500 and met Dale Earnhardt shortly before Earnhardt entered his vehicle for the race. Muniz, who was also attending the race to film for MTV's documentary series True Life, witnessed the subsequent crash on the final lap which killed Earnhardt.

Muniz's career in car racing traces back to 2004, when he ran the Toyota Pro/Celebrity Race in Long Beach as a celebrity participant, finishing 7th. The following year, he finished third, and was the best-finishing celebrity after capitalizing on Ingo Rademacher and Aaron Peirsol's contact on the final lap. While investigating the possibility of joining a racing team as an owner, he was granted a test in a car, and instead signed a two-year deal with Jensen Motorsport as a driver. Muniz entered fourteen races during the 2006 Formula BMW USA season, and failed to finish in a point-scoring position. He was selected as one of the thirty-six drivers to compete in the annual Formula BMW World Final at Valencia. Muniz finished 29th. In April, he again competed in the Toyota Pro/Celebrity, finishing 11th after starting 19th.

In 2007, Muniz moved up to the more competitive Champ Car Atlantic Series, where he competed in the entire season of 12 races. For the season, his best race finish was ninth place, and he officially earned a total of 41 points (for 22nd place) and $17,000 in prize money, logging 351 laps. In January 2007, he placed second at the Sebring Winter National race. He signed with Atlantic Championship-winning team Pacific Coast Motorsports in January 2008, with a goal to consistently compete in the top ten of the points championship. He finished the 2008 season in eleventh place. At the end of the 2008 season, he won the Jovy Marcelo Award, an award for sportsmanship voted on by fellow drivers named in memory of the 1991 Atlantic Championship winner who was killed during practice for the 1992 Indianapolis 500. In 2009, Muniz joined Team Stargate Worlds, and finished in the top ten in every race he contested, with a best finish of fourth at Miller Motorsports Park; however, prior to the penultimate race at Road America, his season was shortened by wrist surgery. In 2011, Muniz returned to the Toyota Pro/Celebrity Race; after starting 15th, he finished 4th.

On October 23, 2021, Muniz made his stock car racing debut at Kern County Raceway Park in Bakersfield, California, competing in the SRL Pro Late Model series driving for High Point Racing.

On November 11, 2026, Muniz was taken to the hospital after being involved in a wreck during practice at a Ford racing event.

==== ARCA Menards Series ====
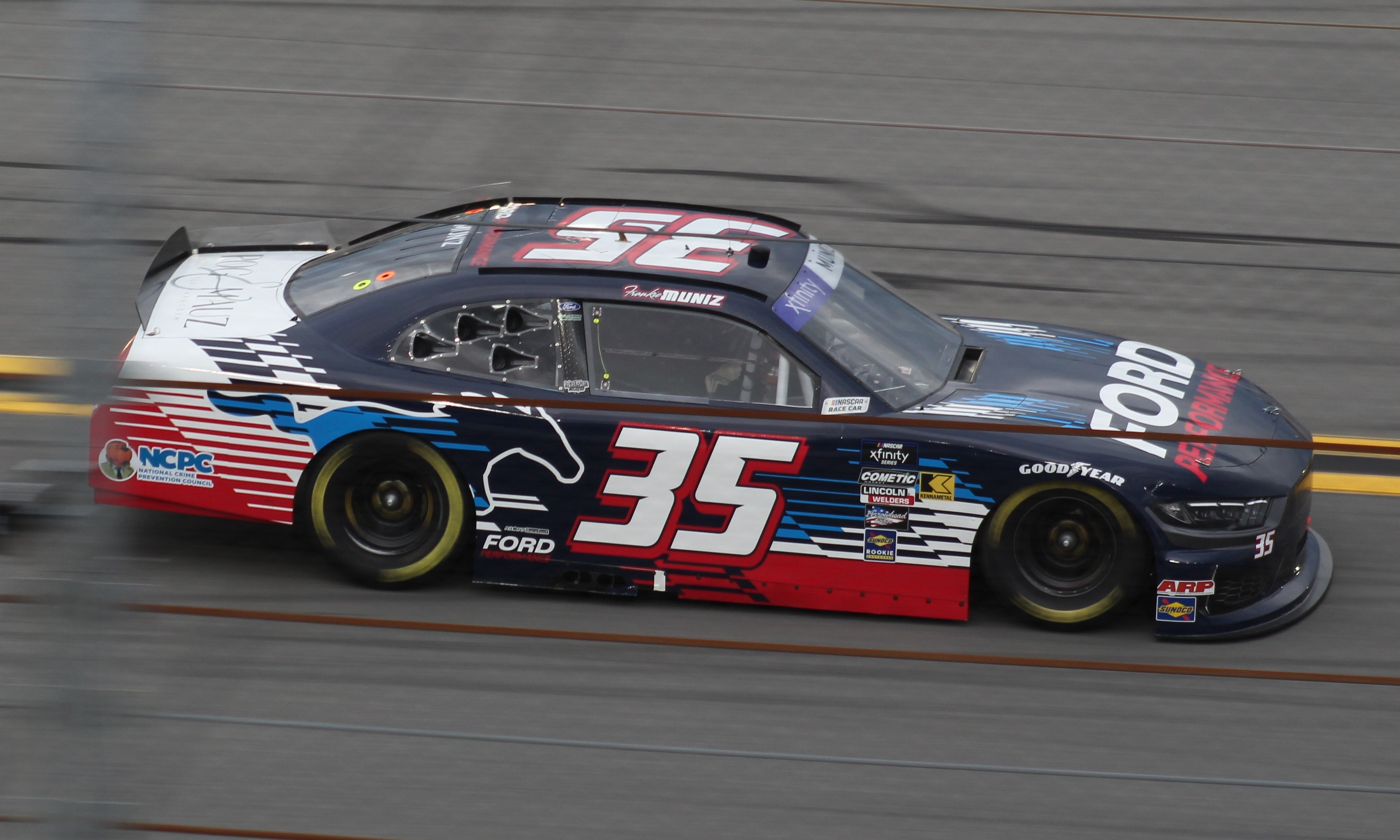
Muniz's No. 35 car at Daytona International Speedway in 2024

In January 2022, Muniz participated in the ARCA Menards Series test at Daytona International Speedway, driving the No. 01 Ford for Fast Track Racing. On January 11, 2023, it was announced that Muniz would drive full-time for Rette Jones Racing in the ARCA Menards Series in the team's No. 30 Ford Mustang. Muniz finished fourth in the standings with one top-five and 11 top-tens, including a season-best fifth-place finish at Michigan International Speedway. In 2024, it was also announced that Muniz would make two additional starts for the team, as well as an ARCA Menards Series start at Michigan International Speedway for the team.

==== NASCAR Xfinity Series ====
On February 9, 2024, it was announced that Muniz would attempt to make his NASCAR Xfinity Series debut at the season-opening race at Daytona International Speedway, driving the No. 35 Ford for Joey Gase Motorsports. Along with that race, he would compete on a part-time schedule in the car. He earned a 33rd-place DNF in his debut race. He also ran at Phoenix, where he once again earned at 30th-place DNF. He failed to qualify for the race at Portland.

==== NASCAR Craftsman Truck Series ====
On June 19, 2024, it was announced that Muniz would attempt his NASCAR Craftsman Truck Series debut at Nashville Superspeedway, driving the No. 22 Ford F-150 for Reaume Brothers Racing.

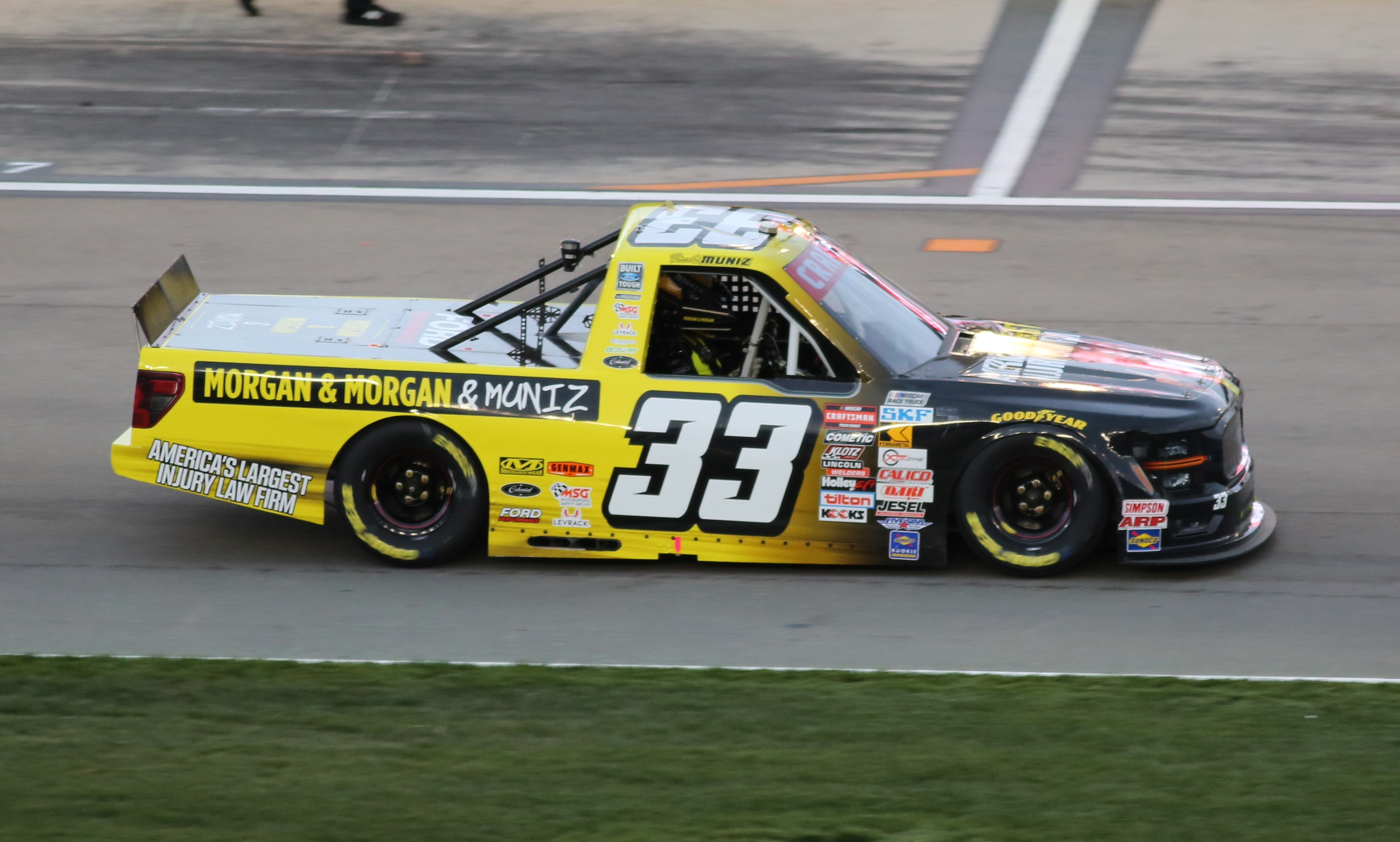
Muniz's No. 33 truck at Las Vegas Motor Speedway in 2025

On October 22, 2024, it was announced that Muniz will drive full-time for Reaume Brothers Racing in the No. 33 truck for the 2025 season, replacing Lawless Alan. Muniz started the 2025 season with an tenth-place finish at Daytona. On August 27, Muniz's season was cut short after he was involved in an accident at his home in Arizona, where he suffered a distal radius fracture in his wrist. On October 13, 2025, Muniz announced that he would return to the No. 33 at Talladega after the doctors gave him the green-light.

On December 8, 2025, it was announced that Muniz will return to the Team Reaume (formerly known as RBR) No. 33 truck full-time for the 2026 season. Muniz started the 2026 season with a 16th-place finish at Daytona. He missed the race at Watkins Glen due to a scheduling conflict and would be replaced by Stephen Mallozzi. He also missed the race at New Hampshire and would be replaced by Reamue driver Luke Baldwin, who failed to qualify for the race. Muniz would miss two events at Kansas and Charlotte due to him pursuing a chance at the GT4 America championship.

=== Music ===
In 2010, Muniz joined the unsigned band You Hang Up as a drummer. In 2012, he joined Kingsfoil, a band based in York, Pennsylvania, and endorsed SJC Drums and Imperial Cymbals. In 2014, he left the band because of scheduling problems. In 2017, Muniz announced on Facebook that he is the manager for the York-based band Astro Lasso, which consists of Jordan Davis and Tristan Martin of his former band Kingsfoil. Muniz travels with the band, doing their monitor systems, lights, as well as being the designated driver. The band opened for We the Kings, Cute Is What We Aim For, and Plaid Brixx on the 10th anniversary of We the Kings' self titled album tour during spring of 2017.

=== Business ventures ===
Muniz has been an active real estate investor throughout his adult life. In addition to purchasing multiple residential properties, Muniz purchased parking lots in Downtown Los Angeles, specifically around the Staples Center, in the early 2000s in an effort to generate passive income with low overhead. Muniz sold the parking lots in 2006.

In 2018, Muniz and Paige Price bought Outrageous Olive Oils & Vinegars, a small specialty shop in Scottsdale, Arizona. He said that he and Price had fallen into "complementary step" with Price handling the inventory and social media while he tackles logistics. In an interview with The Cut, he explained his schedule: "My day this morning started at 6 a.m. getting up to go to Restaurant Depot to get products that we needed. Then I got here early to start filling bottles and to make sure all the shelves were stocked. We're not just ordering product and putting it on the shelf. We bottle everything. We label the bottles. We seal everything. We do all that ourselves here in store. It's a lot of work, but it's really rewarding when people come in and rave about the product." In August 2020, during the COVID-19 pandemic, the two sold the store; they said that Price's pregnancy was the reason for the sale, and that sales were steady despite the pandemic forcing the business into an online-only model.

=== Television ===
On September 6, 2017, Muniz was announced as one of the celebrities who would compete on the 25th season of Dancing with the Stars. He was paired with professional dancer, Witney Carson. Muniz and Carson finished the season in third place. On August 1, 2018, it was announced Muniz would be the co-host of Dancing with the Stars Juniors on ABC, co-hosting with Jordan Fisher who was Season 25's Mirrorball Trophy winner. On March 24, 2024, it was revealed he was joining the Australian adaption of I'm a Celebrity...Get Me Out of Here! as a celebrity contestant. On April 14, Muniz withdrew from the series for family reasons.

== Personal life ==
Muniz is a fan of the Arizona Cardinals, and also of the Los Angeles Clippers. Muniz is reportedly a supporter of English football club Coventry City, this connection apparently coming from a friendship he made with a producer on the set of the film Agent Cody Banks 2: Destination London.

In 2005, Muniz was engaged to Jamie Gandy. In 2008, he met publicist Elycia Marie Turnbow through their mutual personal trainer at a Los Angeles gym. They began dating and later moved to Scottsdale, Arizona. They had a domestic dispute in February 2011, which involved the police and allegedly involved Muniz pointing a gun at his own head, though he later called this a "fake overblown story". They became engaged in October 2011 but later called it off.

Muniz began dating actress and model Paige Price in 2016, and he announced their engagement on November 18, 2018. They married on October 3, 2019. Their son was born on March 22, 2021. On July 1, 2026, Muniz announced in a post on X that he and Paige were separated and proceeding with a divorce.

=== Health problems ===
On November 30, 2012, at age 26, Muniz was hospitalized after having a suspected transient ischemic attack, and spoke about the experience on Katie. He was diagnosed with a second attack a year later on November 25, 2013. When asked about his health in October 2017, he said that he has had no issues. That same month, it was claimed on Dancing with the Stars that he suffered significant amnesia, theorized to be caused (at least partially) by multiple concussions; Muniz gave the impression that he could not remember the majority of his time on Malcolm in the Middle, and that his former co-star Bryan Cranston often called him to remind him about the good times they had.

In 2021, as a guest on the Steve-O's Wild Ride! podcast, Muniz revealed that the mini-strokes were a misdiagnosis and he was instead suffering from migraine auras. He also clarified that the story of his memory loss was largely misinterpreted by media sources. In the same podcast he also clarified that reports of his amnesia were false, and that they were based on a throwaway sentence: "Man, I don't remember what happened in 2001." Individual gaps in his memory occurred due to a large number of concussions as a teenager.

On November 11, 2026, Muniz was hospitalized after crashing his car during a practice lap at a Veterans Day event at the Daytona International Speedway.

== Filmography ==
=== Film ===
Film
Year	Title	Role	Notes
1999	Lost & Found	Movie on TV 'Boy'	
1999	Little Man	Ross	Short film
2000	My Dog Skip	Willie Morris	Main role
2000	It Had to Be You	Franklin	
2001	Dr. Dolittle 2	Boy Bear Cub (voice)	
2002	Big Fat Liar	Jason Shepherd	Main role
2002	Deuces Wild	Scooch	
2003	Agent Cody Banks	Cody Banks	Main role
2003	Stuck on You	Cher's Boyfriend	
2004	Agent Cody Banks 2: Destination London	Cody Banks	Main role
2005	Racing Stripes	Stripes (voice)	
2006	Stay Alive	Swink Sylvania	
2006	Danny Roane: First Time Director	Himself	
2006	Choose Your Own Adventure: The Abominable Snowman	Benjamin North (voice)	Direct-to-video; Executive producer
2007	My Sexiest Year	Jake Stein	
2007	Walk Hard: The Dewey Cox Story	Buddy Holly	
2008	Extreme Movie	Chuck	
2010	The Legend of Secret Pass	Manu (voice)	
2011	Pizza Man	Matt Burns / Pizza Man	
2013	Grapevine Valentine		Short film
2015	Hot Bath an' a Stiff Drink 2	Deputy Allister Jenkins	
2015	Road to Capri	Daniel	
2016	Another Day in Paradise	Mike	
2018	The Black String	Jonathan	
2024	Half Baked: Totally High	Eddie	
2025	Renner	Renner	

=== Television ===
Television
Year	Title	Role	Notes
1997	To Dance with Olivia	Oscar	TV movie
1997	What the Deaf Man Heard	Young Sammy	TV movie
1998	Spin City	Derek Evans	Season 3, episode 9: "The Kidney's All Right"
1999	Sabrina, the Teenage Witch	Angelo	Season 3, episode 16: "Sabrina the Matchmaker"
2000	2000 Kids' Choice Awards	Himself / host	
2000	Miracle in Lane 2	Justin Yoder	TV movie
2000–2006	Malcolm in the Middle	Malcolm	Lead role, 150 episodes
2001	The Andy Dick Show	Young Andy Dick	Season 1, episode 5: "Kid Krist"
2001	The Simpsons	Thelonious (voice)	Season 12, episode 18: "Trilogy of Error"
2001–2003	The Fairly OddParents	Chester McBadbat (voice)	27 episodes
2002	Lizzie McGuire	Himself	Season 2, episode 15: "Lizzie in the Middle"
2002	Titus	Nick Galenti	Season 3, episode 12: "Too Damn Good"
2002	The Nightmare Room	Mike	Episode 13: "Camp Nowhere: Part 2"
2002	Fillmore!	Willie/Augie/Tony (voices)	2 episodes
2002–2003	Moville Mysteries	Mosley "Mo" Moville (voice)	Lead role: 26 episodes
2002, 2005	All That	Himself/host	2 episodes
2003	Clifford the Big Red Dog	Frankie (voice)	Season 2, episode 26: "Little Big Pup/Getting to Know You"
2005	Arrested Development	Himself	Uncredited; Season 3, episode 5: "Mr. F"
2006	Really Rich Real Estate	Himself	Episode: "1.1"
2007	Criminal Minds	Jonny McHale	Season 3, episode 10: "True Night"
2012	Last Man Standing	Richard	Season 1, episode 18: "Baxter & Sons"
2012	Don't Trust the B— in Apartment 23	Himself	Season 2, episode 1: "A Reunion..."
2013	Blast Vegas	Nelson	TV movie; Also known as Destruction: Las Vegas
2015	The Mysteries of Laura	Himself	Episode: "The Mystery of the Crooked Clubber"
2015	Sharknado 3: Oh Hell No!	Lucas Stevens	TV movie
2016	The Clean	Peter Peckwood	
2017	Preacher	Himself	Episode: "Viktor"
2017	Dancing with the Stars	Himself / Contestant	Season 25
2017	Misfit Garage	Himself	Season 5, Episode 8
2018	Dancing with the Stars: Juniors	Himself	Host
2019	Harley Quinn	Himself (voice)	Episode: "Being Harley Quinn"
2020	Total Bellas	Himself	Episode: "Babies on Board"
2021	The Rookie	Corey Harris	Episode: "True Crime"
2022	New Amsterdam	Jace	Episode: "Truth Be Told"
2023	Awkwafina Is Nora from Queens	Shawn	Episode: "Too Hot to Survive"
2024	I'm a Celebrity...Get Me Out of Here! Australia	Himself / Contestant	Season 10, 10th place, walked
2026	Malcolm in the Middle: Life's Still Unfair	Malcolm	TV miniseries (4 episodes)

=== Video games ===
Video Games
Year	Title	Role	Notes
2000	Disney's 102 Dalmatians: Puppies to the Rescue	Domino (voice)	Video game

=== Music videos ===
Music videos
Year	Title	Artist
2022	"Don't Let Me Down" (featuring Zach Myers)	Hanson

== Stage ==
Theatre credits
Year	Title	Role	Venue	Refs.
1997	House Arrest: First Edition	Todd	Arena Stage, Washington, DC	
1999	The Death of Papa	Horace Robedaux Jr.	Hartford Stage, Connecticut	

== Awards and nominations ==
Year	Award	Category	Nominated work	Result
1998	Young Artist Awards	Best Performance in a TV Movie/Pilot/Mini-Series: Young Actor Age Ten or Under	What the Deaf Man Heard	Nominated
1998	YoungStar Award	Best Performance by a Young Actor in a Miniseries/Made-for-TV Movie	What the Deaf Man Heard	Nominated
2000	Giffoni Film Festival	Best Actor	My Dog Skip	Won
2000	Las Vegas Film Critics Society Awards	Youth in Film	My Dog Skip	Nominated
2000	YoungStar Awards	Best Young Actor/Performance in a Motion Picture Drama	My Dog Skip	Nominated
2000	YoungStar Awards	Best Young Actor/Performance in a Comedy TV Series	Malcolm in the Middle	Won
2000	YoungStar Awards	Best Young Ensemble Cast: Television	Malcolm in the Middle	Won
2000	Teen Choice Awards	TV: Choice Actor	Malcolm in the Middle	Nominated
2000	Television Critics Association Awards	Individual Achievement in Comedy	Malcolm in the Middle	Nominated
2001	Young Artist Awards	Best Ensemble in a Feature Film	My Dog Skip	Won
2001	Young Artist Awards	Best Performance in a TV Movie (Drama): Leading Young Actor	Miracle in Lane 2	Nominated
2001	Young Artist Awards	Best Ensemble in a TV Series	Malcolm in the Middle	Nominated
2001	Young Artist Awards	Best Performance in a TV Comedy Series: Leading Young Actor	Malcolm in the Middle	Won
2001	Emmy Awards	Outstanding Lead Actor in a Comedy Series	Malcolm in the Middle	Nominated
2001	Golden Globe Awards	Best Actor – Television Series Musical or Comedy	Malcolm in the Middle	Nominated
2001	Satellite Awards	Best Performance by an Actor in a Series: Comedy or Musical	Malcolm in the Middle	Won
2001	Teen Choice Awards	TV: Choice Actor	Malcolm in the Middle	Nominated
2001	TV Guide Awards	Breakout Star of the Year	Malcolm in the Middle	Nominated
2002	Teen Choice Awards	Film: Choice Chemistry	Big Fat Liar	Nominated
2002	Golden Globe Awards	Best Actor – Television Series Musical or Comedy	Malcolm in the Middle	Nominated
2002	Nickelodeon Kids' Choice Awards	Favorite Television Actor'	Malcolm in the Middle	Nominated
2002	Young Artist Awards	Best Performance in a TV Comedy Series: Leading Young Actor	Malcolm in the Middle	Won
2002	Young Artist Awards	Best Ensemble in a TV Series: (Comedy or Drama)	Malcolm in the Middle	Nominated
2003	Teen Choice Awards	Choice Movie Actor: Comedy	Agent Cody Banks	Nominated
2003	Teen Choice Awards	Choice TV Actor: Comedy	Malcolm in the Middle	Nominated
2003	Nickelodeon Kids' Choice Awards	Favorite Television Actor	Malcolm in the Middle	Won
2003	Young Artist Awards	Best Ensemble in a TV Series: (Comedy or Drama)	Malcolm in the Middle	Won
2003	Young Artist Awards	Best Performance in a TV Series (Comedy or Drama): Leading Young Actor	Malcolm in the Middle	Nominated
2004	Academy of Science Fiction, Fantasy and Horror Films	Best Performance by a Younger Actor	Agent Cody Banks	Nominated
2004	Young Artist Awards	Best Performance in a TV Series (Comedy or Drama): Leading Young Actor	Agent Cody Banks	Nominated
2004	Nickelodeon Kids' Choice Awards	Favorite Television Actor	Malcolm in the Middle	Won
2004	Teen Choice Awards	Choice TV Actor: Comedy	Malcolm in the Middle	Nominated
2005	Nickelodeon Kids' Choice Awards	Favorite Television Actor	Malcolm in the Middle	Nominated
2005	Teen Choice Awards	Choice TV Actor: Comedy	Malcolm in the Middle	Nominated

== Motorsports career results ==
=== Racing career summary ===
Season	Series	Team	Races	Wins	Poles	F/Laps	Podiums	Points	Position
2004	Toyota Pro/Celebrity Race		1	0	0	0	0	N/A	7th
2005	Toyota Pro/Celebrity Race		1	0	0	0	1	N/A	**3rd**
2006	Formula BMW USA	Jensen MotorSport	14	0	0	0	0	0	30th
2006	Formula BMW World Final	Jensen MotorSport	1	0	0	0	0	0	29th
2006	Toyota Pro/Celebrity Race		1	0	0	0	0	N/A	11th
2007	Champ Car Atlantic	Jensen MotorSport	12	0	0	0	0	41	22nd
2007	SCCA Southeast Division National Formula Atlantic	Jensen MotorSport	2	0	0	0	2	22	7th
2008	Atlantic Championship	Pacific Coast Motorsports	11	0	0	0	0	102	11th
2009	Atlantic Championship	Team Stargate Worlds	9	0	0	0	0	62	9th
2011	SCCA Pro Racing Mazda MX-5 Cup		1	0	0	0	0	0	37th
2011	Toyota Pro/Celebrity Race		1	0	0	0	0	N/A	4th
2016	Toyota Pro/Celebrity Race		1	0	0	0	0	N/A	7th
2023	ARCA Menards Series	Rette Jones Racing	20	0	0	N/A	N/A	860	4th
2023	ARCA Menards Series East	Rette Jones Racing	4	0	0	N/A	N/A	121	16th
2023	ARCA Menards Series West	Rette Jones Racing	1	0	0	N/A	N/A	38	41st
2024	ARCA Menards Series	Rette Jones Racing; Reaume Brothers Racing	2	0	0	N/A	N/A	67	56th
2024	NASCAR Xfinity Series	Joey Gase Motorsports	2	0	0	N/A	N/A	N/A	N/A
2024	NASCAR Craftsman Truck Series	Reaume Brothers Racing	4	0	0	N/A	N/A	21	54th
2025	NASCAR Craftsman Truck Series	Reaume Brothers Racing	16	0	0	0	N/A	192	24th
2025	Mustang Challenge Le Mans Invitational - Dark Horse Stars class	TechSport Racing	2	0	0	0	2	N/A	N/A
2026	NASCAR Craftsman Truck Series	Reaume Brothers Racing	21	0	0	0	N/A	236	25th
2026	Pirelli GT4 America Series – Amateur Cup	TechSport Racing	13	3	0	0	7	204	**1st**

^{*} Season still in progress.

=== American open-wheel racing results ===
(key)

==== Atlantic Championship ====
Year	Team	1	2	3	4	5	6	7	8	9	10	11	12	Rank	Points	Ref
2007	Jensen MotorSport	LVG; Ret	LBH; 19	HOU; 21	POR1; Ret	POR2; 20	CLE; Ret	MTT; Ret	TOR; 9	EDM1; 17	EDM2; 16	SJO; 11	ROA; 18	**22nd**	**41**	
2008	Pacific Coast Motorsports	LBH; 15	LS; 13	MTT; 11	EDM1; 12	EDM2; 13	ROA1; 11	ROA2; 10	TRR; 12	NJ; 10	UTA; 14	ATL; 9		**11th**	**102**	
2009	Team Stargate Worlds	SEB; 10	UTA; 4	NJ1; 8	NJ2; 8	LIM; 10	ACC1; 7	ACC2; 7	MOH; 8	TRR; 6	MOS	ATL	LS	**9th**	**62**	

=== NASCAR ===
(key) (Bold – Pole position awarded by qualifying time. Italics – Pole position earned by points standings or practice time. * – Most laps led.)

==== Xfinity Series ====
NASCAR Xfinity Series results
Year	Team	No.	Make	1	2	3	4	5	6	7	8	9	10	11	12	13	14	15	16	17	18	19	20	21	22	23	24	25	26	27	28	29	30	31	32	33	NXSC	Pts	Ref
2024	Joey Gase Motorsports	35	Ford	DAY; 33	ATL	LVS	PHO; 30	COA	RCH	MAR	TEX	TAL	DOV	DAR	CLT	PIR; DNQ	SON	IOW	NHA	NSH	CSC	POC	IND	MCH	DAY	DAR	ATL	GLN	BRI	KAN	TAL	ROV	LVS	HOM	MAR	PHO	105th	0^{1}	

==== Craftsman Truck Series ====
NASCAR Craftsman Truck Series results
Year	Team	No.	Make	1	2	3	4	5	6	7	8	9	10	11	12	13	14	15	16	17	18	19	20	21	22	23	24	25	NCTC	Pts	Ref
2024	Reaume Brothers Racing	22	Ford	DAY	ATL	LVS	BRI	COA	MAR	TEX	KAN	DAR	NWS	CLT	GTW	NSH; 31	POC	IRP	RCH	MLW	BRI	KAN; 29	TAL	HOM; 33	MAR				54th	21	
2024	Reaume Brothers Racing	27	Ford																							PHO; 34			54th	21	
2025	Reaume Brothers Racing	33	Ford	DAY; 10	ATL; 26	LVS; 24	HOM; 24	MAR; 33	BRI; 31	CAR; 23	TEX; 25	KAN; 28	NWS; 29	CLT; 27	NSH; 32	MCH; 14	POC; 19	LRP; 28	IRP; 27	GLN; 27	RCH; 32	DAR	BRI	NHA	ROV	TAL; 20	MAR; 23	PHO; 19	26th	256	
2026	Team Reaume	33	Ford	DAY; 16	ATL; 25	STP; 30	DAR; 18	CAR; 31	BRI; 35	TEX; 23	GLN	DOV; 24	CLT; 24	NSH; 24	MCH; 23	COR; 20	LRP; 26	NWS; 32	IRP; 29	RCH; 30	NHA; QL^{†}	BRI; 33	KAN	CLT	PHO; 33	TAL; 12	MAR; 25	HOM; 28	25th	236	
^{†} – Qualified but replaced by Luke Baldwin

^{*} Season still in progress
^{1} Ineligible for series points

=== ARCA Menards Series ===
(key) (Bold – Pole position awarded by qualifying time. Italics – Pole position earned by points standings or practice time. * – Most laps led. ** – All laps led.)

ARCA Menards Series results
Year	Team	No.	Make	1	2	3	4	5	6	7	8	9	10	11	12	13	14	15	16	17	18	19	20	AMSC	Pts	Ref
2023	Rette Jones Racing	30	Ford	DAY; 11	PHO; 6	TAL; 9	KAN; 8	CLT; 6	BLN; 6	ELK; 16	MOH; 6	IOW; 9	POC; 21	MCH; 5	IRP; 11	GLN; 16	ISF; 7	MLW; 12	DSF; 12	KAN; 18	BRI; 23	SLM; 10	TOL; 8	4th	860	
2024	Rette Jones Racing	30	Ford	DAY	PHO	TAL; 9	DOV	KAN	CLT	IOW	MOH	BLN	IRP	SLM	ELK									56th	67	
2024	Reaume Brothers Racing	33	Ford													MCH; 12	ISF	MLW	DSF	GLN	BRI	KAN	TOL	56th	67	

==== ARCA Menards Series East ====
ARCA Menards Series East results
Year	Team	No.	Make	1	2	3	4	5	6	7	8	AMSEC	Pts	Ref
2023	Rette Jones Racing	30	Ford	FIF	DOV	NSV	FRS	IOW; 9	IRP; 11	MLW; 12	BRI; 23	15th	171	

==== ARCA Menards Series West ====
ARCA Menards Series West results
Year	Team	No.	Make	1	2	3	4	5	6	7	8	9	10	11	12	AMSWC	Pts	Ref
2023	Rette Jones Racing	30	Ford	PHO; 6	IRW	KCR	PIR	SON	IRW	SHA	EVG	AAS	LVS	MAD	PHO	41st	38	
