= 2026 Black's Tire 200 =

2026 Black's Tire 200 may refer to:

- 2026 Black's Tire 200 (Rockingham), at Rockingham Speedway on April 3
- 2026 Black's Tire 200 (Martinsville), at Martinsville Speedway on October 30

== See also ==
- 2026 Black's Tire 250, at Richmond Raceway on August 15
