= 2026 Team EJP 175 =

NASCAR Craftsman Truck Series race at New Hampshire Motor Speedway

Race details
- Race 18 of 25 in the 2026 NASCAR Craftsman Truck Series
- Date: August 22, 2026
- Location: New Hampshire Motor Speedway in Loudon, New Hampshire
- Course: Permanent racing facility
- Course length: 1.058 miles (2.426 km)
- Distance: 189 laps, 199.96 mi (321.808 km)
- Scheduled distance: 175 laps, 185.15 mi (297.97 km)
- Average speed: 86.325 miles per hour (138.927 km/h)

Pole position
Driver	Layne Riggs	Front Row Motorsports
- Time: 29.346

Most laps led
Driver	Layne Riggs	Front Row Motorsports
- Laps: 106

Fastest lap
Driver	Connor Zilisch	Spire Motorsports
- Time: 30.270

Winner
No. 34	Layne Riggs	Front Row Motorsports

Television in the United States
- Network: FS1
- Announcers: Brent Stover, Regan Smith, and Michael Waltrip

Radio in the United States
- Radio: NRN
- Booth announcers: Brad Gillie and Nick Yeoman
- Turn announcers: Andrew Kurland (1 & 2) and Pat Patterson (3 & 4)

The 2026 Team EJP 175 was a NASCAR Craftsman Truck Series race held on Saturday, August 22, 2026, at New Hampshire Motor Speedway in Loudon, New Hampshire. Contested over 189 laps—extended from 175 laps due to a double overtime finish on the 1.058-mile (1.703 km) oval, it was the 18th race of the 2026 NASCAR Craftsman Truck Series season, and the second running of the event. It was also the final race of the regular season, as the top ten drivers in points after this race advanced to the Chase, a seven-race postseason to determine the NASCAR Craftsman Truck Series champion.

Layne Riggs, driving for Front Row Motorsports, dominated the final stage, leading the final 71 laps and surviving a chaotic double overtime restart to score his 11th career NASCAR Craftsman Truck Series win, and his sixth of the season. Connor Zilisch swept both stages, and Riggs led the race-high 106 laps. At race's end, Chandler Smith finished second, and Kaden Honeycutt finished third. Stewart Friesen and Zilisch rounded out the top five, while Tristan McKee, Christopher Bell, Daniel Hemric, Justin Haley, and Parker Eatmon rounded out the top ten.

The 2026 Chase field was set; the 10 drivers that qualified were Riggs, Honeycutt, Smith, Christian Eckes, Gio Ruggiero, Ty Majeski, Grant Enfinger, Hemric, Ben Rhodes, and Ankrum.

== Report ==
=== Background ===
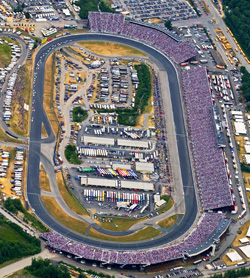
New Hampshire Motor Speedway, the track where the race was held.

New Hampshire Motor Speedway is a 1.058-mile (1.703 km) oval speedway located in Loudon, New Hampshire, which has hosted NASCAR racing annually since the early 1990s, as well as the longest-running motorcycle race in North America, the Loudon Classic. Nicknamed "The Magic Mile", the speedway is often converted into a 1.6-mile (2.6 km) road course, which includes much of the oval.

The track was originally the site of Bryar Motorsports Park before being purchased and redeveloped by Bob Bahre. The track is currently one of eight major NASCAR tracks owned and operated by Speedway Motorsports.

==== Entry list ====
- (R) denotes rookie driver.
- (i) denotes driver who is ineligible for series driver points.

#	Driver	Team	Make
1	Gavan Boschele	Tricon Garage	Toyota
2	Luke Baldwin	Team Reaume	Ford
4	Connor Hall	Niece Motorsports	Chevrolet
5	John Hunter Nemechek (i)	Tricon Garage	Toyota
7	Connor Mosack	Spire Motorsports	Chevrolet
9	Grant Enfinger	CR7 Motorsports	Chevrolet
10	Corey LaJoie	Kaulig Racing	Ram
11	Kaden Honeycutt	Tricon Garage	Toyota
12	Brenden Queen (R)	Kaulig Racing	Ram
13	Cole Butcher (R)	ThorSport Racing	Ford
14	Mini Tyrrell (R)	Kaulig Racing	Ram
15	Tanner Gray	Tricon Garage	Toyota
16	Justin Haley	Kaulig Racing	Ram
17	Gio Ruggiero	Tricon Garage	Toyota
18	Tyler Ankrum	McAnally–Hilgemann Racing	Chevrolet
19	Daniel Hemric	McAnally–Hilgemann Racing	Chevrolet
20	Mason Massey	McAnally–Hilgemann Racing	Chevrolet
22	Patrick Emerling	Team Reaume	Ford
25	Colin Braun	Kaulig Racing	Ram
26	Toni Breidinger	Rackley W.A.R.	Chevrolet
27	Dawson Sutton	Rackley W.A.R.	Chevrolet
33	Frankie Muniz	Team Reaume	Ford
34	Layne Riggs	Front Row Motorsports	Ford
38	Chandler Smith	Front Row Motorsports	Ford
42	Parker Eatmon	Niece Motorsports	Chevrolet
44	Andrés Pérez de Lara	Niece Motorsports	Chevrolet
45	Landen Lewis	Niece Motorsports	Chevrolet
52	Stewart Friesen	Halmar Friesen Racing	Toyota
56	Timmy Hill	Hill Motorsports	Toyota
62	Christopher Bell (i)	Halmar Friesen Racing	Toyota
69	Derek White (i)	MBM Motorsports	Ram
71	Connor Zilisch (i)	Spire Motorsports	Chevrolet
72	Mike Christopher Jr.	Halmar Friesen Racing	Toyota
76	Spencer Boyd	Freedom Racing Enterprises	Chevrolet
77	Tristan McKee	Spire Motorsports	Chevrolet
81	Kris Wright	McAnally–Hilgemann Racing	Chevrolet
88	Ty Majeski	ThorSport Racing	Ford
91	Christian Eckes	McAnally–Hilgemann Racing	Chevrolet
93	D. L. Wilson	Costner Motorsports	Chevrolet
98	Jake Garcia	ThorSport Racing	Ford
99	Ben Rhodes	ThorSport Racing	Ford
Official entry list

== Practice ==
The first and only practice session was held on Friday, August 21, at 4:00 PM EST, and lasted for 50 minutes.

Gio Ruggiero, driving for Tricon Garage, set the fastest time in the session, with a lap of 29.799 seconds, and a speed of 127.816 miles per hour (205.700 km/h).

=== Practice results ===
Pos.	#	Driver	Team	Make	Time	Speed
1	17	Gio Ruggiero	Tricon Garage	Toyota	29.799	127.816
2	71	Connor Zilisch (i)	Spire Motorsports	Chevrolet	29.806	127.786
3	77	Tristan McKee	Spire Motorsports	Chevrolet	29.996	126.977
Full practice results

== Qualifying ==
Qualifying was held on Friday, August 21, at 5:05 PM EST. Since New Hampshire Motor Speedway is a mile oval, the qualifying procedure used was a single-car, one-lap system with one round. Drivers were on track by themselves and had one lap to post a qualifying time, and whoever set the fastest time won the pole.

Layne Riggs, driving for Front Row Motorsports, qualified on pole position with a lap of 29.346 seconds, and a speed of 129.789 miles per hour (208.875 km/h).

Five drivers failed to qualify: Frankie Muniz, Mason Massey, Derek White, D. L. Wilson, and Toni Breidinger. Dawson Sutton, who originally failed to qualify in his No. 27 truck, would move over to the No. 26 truck, replacing Breidinger, who originally made the race. Luke Baldwin, who originally failed to qualify in his No. 2 truck, would move over to the No. 33 truck, replacing Muniz, who originally made the race.

=== Qualifying results ===
Pos.	#	Driver	Team	Make	Time	Speed
1	34	Layne Riggs	Front Row Motorsports	Ford	29.346	129.789
2	11	Kaden Honeycutt	Tricon Garage	Toyota	29.569	128.811
3	17	Gio Ruggiero	Tricon Garage	Toyota	29.581	128.758
4	71	Connor Zilisch (i)	Spire Motorsports	Chevrolet	29.606	128.650
5	77	Tristan McKee	Spire Motorsports	Chevrolet	29.631	128.541
6	19	Daniel Hemric	McAnally–Hilgemann Racing	Chevrolet	29.727	128.126
7	1	Gavan Boschele	Tricon Garage	Toyota	29.732	128.104
8	9	Grant Enfinger	CR7 Motorsports	Chevrolet	29.746	128.044
9	98	Jake Garcia	ThorSport Racing	Ford	29.760	127.984
10	99	Ben Rhodes	ThorSport Racing	Ford	29.762	127.975
11	7	Connor Mosack	Spire Motorsports	Chevrolet	29.791	127.851
12	38	Chandler Smith	Front Row Motorsports	Ford	29.815	127.748
13	52	Stewart Friesen	Halmar Friesen Racing	Toyota	29.865	127.534
14	13	Cole Butcher (R)	ThorSport Racing	Ford	29.873	127.500
15	18	Tyler Ankrum	McAnally–Hilgemann Racing	Chevrolet	29.915	127.321
16	88	Ty Majeski	ThorSport Racing	Ford	29.920	127.299
17	62	Christopher Bell (i)	Halmar Friesen Racing	Toyota	29.934	127.240
18	42	Parker Eatmon	Niece Motorsports	Chevrolet	29.949	127.176
19	91	Christian Eckes	McAnally–Hilgemann Racing	Chevrolet	29.962	127.121
20	15	Tanner Gray	Tricon Garage	Toyota	29.972	127.079
21	72	Mike Christopher Jr.	Halmar Friesen Racing	Toyota	30.032	126.825
22	45	Landen Lewis	Niece Motorsports	Chevrolet	30.035	126.812
23	5	John Hunter Nemechek (i)	Tricon Garage	Toyota	30.077	126.635
24	10	Corey LaJoie	Kaulig Racing	Ram	30.132	126.404
25	16	Justin Haley	Kaulig Racing	Ram	30.153	126.316
26	12	Brenden Queen (R)	Kaulig Racing	Ram	30.169	126.249
27	4	Connor Hall	Niece Motorsports	Chevrolet	30.192	126.153
28	81	Kris Wright	McAnally–Hilgemann Racing	Chevrolet	30.213	126.065
29	44	Andrés Pérez de Lara	Niece Motorsports	Chevrolet	30.227	126.007
30	25	Colin Braun	Kaulig Racing	Ram	30.271	125.823
31	56	Timmy Hill	Hill Motorsports	Toyota	30.284	125.769
Qualified by owner's points
32	22	Patrick Emerling	Team Reaume	Ford	30.363	125.442
33	14	Mini Tyrrell (R)	Kaulig Racing	Ram	30.376	125.388
34	26	Toni Breidinger	Rackley W.A.R.	Chevrolet	30.499	124.883
35	76	Spencer Boyd	Freedom Racing Enterprises	Chevrolet	30.943	123.091
36	33	Frankie Muniz	Team Reaume	Ford	31.068	122.596
Failed to qualify
37	2	Luke Baldwin	Team Reaume	Ford	30.398	125.298
38	20	Mason Massey	McAnally–Hilgemann Racing	Chevrolet	30.444	125.108
39	69	Derek White (i)	MBM Motorsports	Ram	31.505	120.895
40	93	D. L. Wilson	Costner Motorsports	Chevrolet	—	—
41	27	Dawson Sutton	Rackley W.A.R.	Chevrolet	—	—
Official qualifying results
Official starting lineup

== Race ==
=== Race results ===
==== Stage Results ====
Stage One Laps: 55

Pos.	#	Driver	Team	Make	Pts
1	71	Connor Zilisch (i)	Spire Motorsports	Chevrolet	0
2	34	Layne Riggs	Front Row Motorsports	Ford	9
3	19	Daniel Hemric	McAnally-Hilgemann Racing	Chevrolet	8
4	38	Chandler Smith	Front Row Motorsports	Ford	7
5	62	Christopher Bell (i)	Halmar Friesen Racing	Toyota	0
6	17	Gio Ruggiero	Tricon Garage	Toyota	5
7	77	Tristan McKee	Spire Motorsports	Chevrolet	4
8	9	Grant Enfinger	CR7 Motorsports	Chevrolet	3
9	98	Jake Garcia	ThorSport Racing	Ford	2
10	1	Gavan Boschele	Tricon Garage	Toyota	1

Stage Two Laps: 55

Pos.	#	Driver	Team	Make	Pts
1	71	Connor Zilisch (i)	Spire Motorsports	Chevrolet	0
2	38	Chandler Smith	Front Row Motorsports	Ford	9
3	34	Layne Riggs	Front Row Motorsports	Ford	8
4	62	Christopher Bell (i)	Halmar Friesen Racing	Toyota	0
5	98	Jake Garcia	ThorSport Racing	Ford	6
6	17	Gio Ruggiero	Tricon Garage	Toyota	5
7	19	Daniel Hemric	McAnally-Hilgemann Racing	Chevrolet	4
8	1	Gavan Boschele	Tricon Garage	Toyota	3
9	7	Connor Mosack	Spire Motorsports	Chevrolet	2
10	52	Stewart Friesen	Halmar Friesen Racing	Toyota	1

Stage Three Laps: 79

Fin	St	#	Driver	Team	Make	Laps	Led	Status	Pts
1	1	34	Layne Riggs	Front Row Motorsports	Ford	189	106	Running	72
2	12	38	Chandler Smith	Front Row Motorsports	Ford	189	10	Running	51
3	2	11	Kaden Honeycutt	Tricon Garage	Toyota	189	0	Running	34
4	13	52	Stewart Friesen	Halmar Friesen Racing	Toyota	189	4	Running	34
5	4	71	Connor Zilisch (i)	Spire Motorsports	Chevrolet	189	55	Running	0
6	5	77	Tristan McKee	Spire Motorsports	Chevrolet	189	0	Running	35
7	17	62	Christopher Bell (i)	Halmar Friesen Racing	Toyota	189	0	Running	0
8	6	19	Daniel Hemric	McAnally–Hilgemann Racing	Chevrolet	189	0	Running	41
9	25	16	Justin Haley	Kaulig Racing	Ram	189	0	Running	28
10	18	42	Parker Eatmon	Niece Motorsports	Chevrolet	189	0	Running	27
11	16	88	Ty Majeski	ThorSport Racing	Ford	189	0	Running	26
12	21	72	Mike Christopher Jr.	Halmar Friesen Racing	Toyota	189	0	Running	25
13	8	9	Grant Enfinger	CR7 Motorsports	Chevrolet	189	0	Running	27
14	9	98	Jake Garcia	ThorSport Racing	Ford	189	14	Running	31
15	24	10	Corey LaJoie	Kaulig Racing	Ram	189	0	Running	22
16	15	18	Tyler Ankrum	McAnally–Hilgemann Racing	Chevrolet	189	0	Running	21
17	14	13	Cole Butcher (R)	ThorSport Racing	Ford	189	0	Running	20
18	10	99	Ben Rhodes	ThorSport Racing	Ford	189	0	Running	19
19	23	5	John Hunter Nemechek (i)	Tricon Garage	Toyota	189	0	Running	0
20	26	12	Brenden Queen (R)	Kaulig Racing	Ram	189	0	Running	17
21	20	15	Tanner Gray	Tricon Garage	Toyota	189	0	Running	16
22	27	4	Connor Hall	Niece Motorsports	Chevrolet	189	0	Running	15
23	33	14	Mini Tyrrell (R)	Kaulig Racing	Ram	189	0	Running	14
24	30	25	Colin Braun	Kaulig Racing	Ram	189	0	Running	13
25	34	26	Dawson Sutton	Rackley W.A.R.	Chevrolet	189	0	Running	12
26	3	17	Gio Ruggiero	Tricon Garage	Toyota	189	0	Running	21
27	29	44	Andrés Pérez de Lara	Niece Motorsports	Chevrolet	189	0	Running	10
28	19	91	Christian Eckes	McAnally–Hilgemann Racing	Chevrolet	189	0	Running	9
29	31	56	Timmy Hill	Hill Motorsports	Toyota	187	0	Running	8
30	11	7	Connor Mosack	Spire Motorsports	Chevrolet	179	0	Accident	9
31	36	33	Luke Baldwin	Team Reaume	Ford	177	0	Running	6
32	22	45	Landen Lewis	Niece Motorsports	Chevrolet	177	0	Running	5
33	7	1	Gavan Boschele	Tricon Garage	Toyota	169	0	Accident	8
34	28	81	Kris Wright	McAnally–Hilgemann Racing	Chevrolet	146	0	Vibration	3
35	32	22	Patrick Emerling	Team Reaume	Ford	131	0	Suspension	2
36	35	76	Spencer Boyd	Freedom Racing Enterprises	Chevrolet	75	0	Accident	1
Official race results

=== Race statistics ===
- Lead changes: 6 among 5 different drivers
- Cautions/Laps: 9 for 56 laps
- Red flags: 0
- Time of race: 2 hours, 18 minutes and 59 seconds
- Average speed: 86.325 miles per hour (138.927 km/h)

== Standings after the race ==
Drivers' Championship standings

	Pos	Driver	Points
	1	Layne Riggs	2,100
	2	Kaden Honeycutt	2,075 (–25)
	3	Chandler Smith	2,065 (–35)
	4	Christian Eckes	2,060 (–40)
	5	Gio Ruggiero	2,055 (–45)
	6	Ty Majeski	2,050 (–50)
	7	Grant Enfinger	2,045 (–55)
1	8	Daniel Hemric	2,040 (–60)
1	9	Ben Rhodes	2,035 (–65)
	10	Tyler Ankrum	2,030 (–70)
Official driver's standings

Manufacturers' Championship standings

Pos	Manufacturer	Points
1	Ford	756
2	Toyota	728 (–28)
3	Chevrolet	693 (–63)
4	Ram	458 (–298)

- Note: Only the first 10 positions are included for the driver standings.

Previous race: 2026 Black's Tire 250	NASCAR Craftsman Truck Series; 2026 season	Next race: 2026 UNOH 250
