= 2026 Black's Tire 250 =

NASCAR Craftsman Truck Series race at Richmond Raceway

Race details
- Race 17 of 25 in the 2026 NASCAR Craftsman Truck Series
- Date: August 15, 2026
- Location: Richmond Raceway in Richmond, Virginia
- Course: Permanent racing facility
- Course length: 0.75 miles (1.207 km)
- Distance: 250 laps, 187.50 mi (301.752 km)
- Average speed: 93.155 miles per hour (149.918 km/h)

Pole position
Driver	Shane van Gisbergen	Spire Motorsports
- Time: 23.168

Most laps led
Driver	Kaden Honeycutt	Tricon Garage
- Laps: 225

Fastest lap
Driver	Kaden Honeycutt	Tricon Garage
- Time: 23.511

Winner
No. 11	Kaden Honeycutt	Tricon Garage

Television in the United States
- Network: FS2
- Announcers: Eric Brennan, Regan Smith, and Michael Waltrip

Radio in the United States
- Radio: NRN
- Booth announcers: Alex Hayden and Mike Bagley
- Turn announcers: Dave Moody (Backstretch)

The 2026 Black's Tire 250 was a NASCAR Craftsman Truck Series race held on Saturday, August 15, 2026, at Richmond Raceway in Richmond, Virginia. Originally scheduled for Friday, August 14, it was postponed until Saturday due to inclement weather. Contested over 250 laps on the 0.75-mile (1.21 km) D-shaped oval, it was the 17th race of the 2026 NASCAR Craftsman Truck Series season, and the 7th and final running of the event.

In a weather delayed race, Kaden Honeycutt, driving for Tricon Garage, pulled off a dominating performance, leading a race-high 225 laps and sweeping both stages to score his second career NASCAR Craftsman Truck Series win, and his second of the season. Honeycutt's teammate Corey Heim finished second, and Christian Eckes finished third. Pole-sitter Shane van Gisbergen and Grant Enfinger rounded out the top five, while Jake Garcia, Chandler Smith, Tristan McKee, Gio Ruggiero, and Daniel Hemric rounded out the top ten.

Following the race, Ty Majeski clinched a spot in The Chase.

== Report ==
=== Background ===
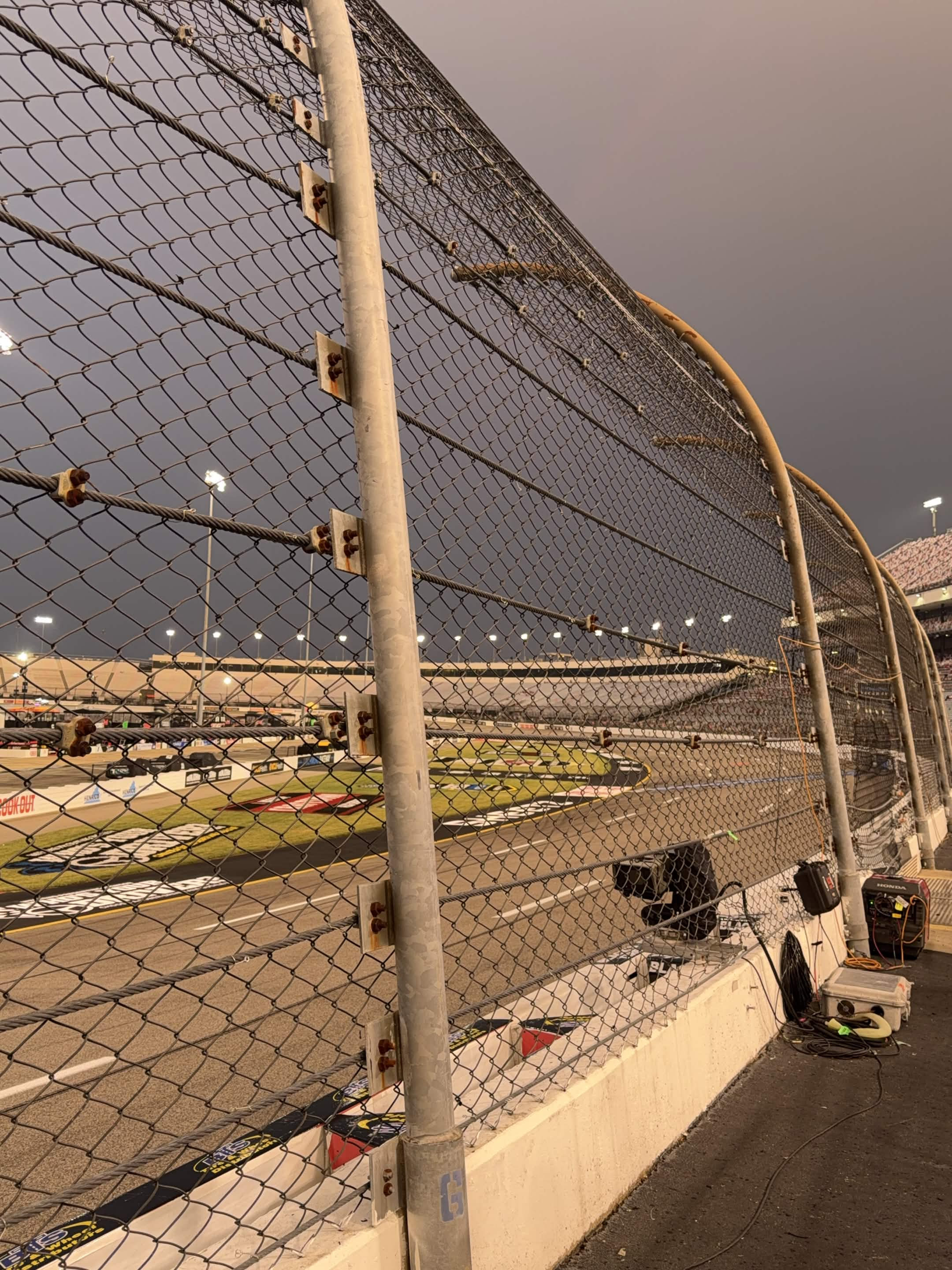
Richmond Raceway, the track where the race was held.

Richmond Raceway (RR) is a 0.75 miles (1.21 km), D-shaped, asphalt race track located just outside Richmond, Virginia in unincorporated Henrico County. It hosts the NASCAR Cup Series, NASCAR O'Reilly Auto Parts Series and the NASCAR Craftsman Truck Series. Known as "America's premier short track", it has formerly hosted events such as the International Race of Champions, Denny Hamlin Short Track Showdown, and the USAC sprint car series. Due to Richmond Raceway's unique "D" shape which allows drivers to reach high speeds, Richmond has long been known as a short track that races like a superspeedway. With its multiple racing grooves, and proclivity for contact Richmond is a favorite among NASCAR drivers and fans.

==== Entry list ====
- (R) denotes rookie driver.
- (i) denotes driver who is ineligible for series driver points.

#	Driver	Team	Make
1	Nick Leitz	Tricon Garage	Toyota
2	Dystany Spurlock	Team Reaume	Ford
4	Connor Hall	Niece Motorsports	Chevrolet
5	Corey Heim	Tricon Garage	Toyota
7	Shane van Gisbergen (i)	Spire Motorsports	Chevrolet
9	Grant Enfinger	CR7 Motorsports	Chevrolet
10	Corey LaJoie	Kaulig Racing	Ram
11	Kaden Honeycutt	Tricon Garage	Toyota
12	Brenden Queen (R)	Kaulig Racing	Ram
13	Cole Butcher (R)	ThorSport Racing	Ford
14	Mini Tyrrell (R)	Kaulig Racing	Ram
15	Tanner Gray	Tricon Garage	Toyota
16	Justin Haley	Kaulig Racing	Ram
17	Gio Ruggiero	Tricon Garage	Toyota
18	Tyler Ankrum	McAnally–Hilgemann Racing	Chevrolet
19	Daniel Hemric	McAnally–Hilgemann Racing	Chevrolet
20	Mason Massey	McAnally–Hilgemann Racing	Chevrolet
22	Derek Lemke	Team Reaume	Ford
25	Elliott Sadler	Kaulig Racing	Ram
26	Dawson Sutton	Rackley W.A.R.	Chevrolet
27	Kasey Kleyn	Rackley W.A.R.	Chevrolet
33	Frankie Muniz	Team Reaume	Ford
34	Layne Riggs	Front Row Motorsports	Ford
38	Chandler Smith	Front Row Motorsports	Ford
42	Parker Eatmon	Niece Motorsports	Chevrolet
44	Andrés Pérez de Lara	Niece Motorsports	Chevrolet
45	Landen Lewis	Niece Motorsports	Chevrolet
52	Stewart Friesen	Halmar Friesen Racing	Toyota
56	Timmy Hill	Hill Motorsports	Toyota
62	Christopher Bell (i)	Halmar Friesen Racing	Toyota
76	Spencer Boyd	Freedom Racing Enterprises	Chevrolet
77	Tristan McKee	Spire Motorsports	Chevrolet
81	Kris Wright	McAnally–Hilgemann Racing	Chevrolet
88	Ty Majeski	ThorSport Racing	Ford
90	Justin Carroll	TC Motorsports	Toyota
91	Christian Eckes	McAnally–Hilgemann Racing	Chevrolet
93	Caleb Costner	Costner Motorsports	Chevrolet
98	Jake Garcia	ThorSport Racing	Ford
99	Ben Rhodes	ThorSport Racing	Ford
Official entry list

== Practice ==
The first and only practice session was held on Friday, August 14, at 1:00 PM EST, and lasted for 50 minutes.

Layne Riggs, driving for Front Row Motorsports, set the fastest time in the session, with a lap of 22.899 seconds, and a speed of 117.909 miles per hour (189.756 km/h).

=== Practice results ===
Pos.	#	Driver	Team	Make	Time	Speed
1	34	Layne Riggs	Front Row Motorsports	Ford	22.899	117.909
2	88	Ty Majeski	ThorSport Racing	Ford	22.962	117.586
3	12	Brenden Queen (R)	Kaulig Racing	Ram	23.048	117.147
Full practice results

== Qualifying ==
Qualifying was held on Friday, August 14, at 2:05 PM EST. Since Richmond Raceway is a short track, the qualifying procedure used was a single-car, two-lap system with one round. Drivers were on track by themselves and had two laps to post a qualifying time, and whoever set the fastest time won the pole.

Shane van Gisbergen, driving for Spire Motorsports, qualified on pole position with a lap of 23.168 seconds, and a speed of 116.540 miles per hour (187.553 km/h).

Three drivers failed to qualify: Kasey Kleyn, Caleb Costner, and Justin Carroll.

=== Qualifying results ===
Pos.	#	Driver	Team	Make	Time	Speed
1	7	Shane van Gisbergen (i)	Spire Motorsports	Chevrolet	23.168	116.540
2	11	Kaden Honeycutt	Tricon Garage	Toyota	23.182	116.470
3	38	Chandler Smith	Front Row Motorsports	Ford	23.253	116.114
4	9	Grant Enfinger	CR7 Motorsports	Chevrolet	23.259	116.084
5	1	Nick Leitz	Tricon Garage	Toyota	23.264	116.059
6	42	Parker Eatmon	Niece Motorsports	Chevrolet	23.290	115.930
7	88	Ty Majeski	ThorSport Racing	Ford	23.306	115.850
8	44	Andrés Pérez de Lara	Niece Motorsports	Chevrolet	23.335	115.706
9	52	Stewart Friesen	Halmar Friesen Racing	Toyota	23.337	115.696
10	18	Tyler Ankrum	McAnally–Hilgemann Racing	Chevrolet	23.339	115.686
11	34	Layne Riggs	Front Row Motorsports	Ford	23.343	115.666
12	91	Christian Eckes	McAnally–Hilgemann Racing	Chevrolet	23.356	115.602
13	77	Tristan McKee	Spire Motorsports	Chevrolet	23.370	115.533
14	17	Gio Ruggiero	Tricon Garage	Toyota	23.414	115.316
15	99	Ben Rhodes	ThorSport Racing	Ford	23.415	115.311
16	5	Corey Heim	Tricon Garage	Toyota	23.444	115.168
17	62	Christopher Bell (i)	Halmar Friesen Racing	Toyota	23.447	115.153
18	10	Corey LaJoie	Kaulig Racing	Ram	23.456	115.109
19	16	Justin Haley	Kaulig Racing	Ram	23.459	115.094
20	19	Daniel Hemric	McAnally–Hilgemann Racing	Chevrolet	23.471	115.036
21	98	Jake Garcia	ThorSport Racing	Ford	23.471	115.036
22	15	Tanner Gray	Tricon Garage	Toyota	23.477	115.006
23	56	Timmy Hill	Hill Motorsports	Toyota	23.560	114.601
24	45	Landen Lewis	Niece Motorsports	Chevrolet	23.571	114.548
25	13	Cole Butcher (R)	ThorSport Racing	Ford	23.591	114.450
26	12	Brenden Queen (R)	Kaulig Racing	Chevrolet	23.608	114.368
27	26	Dawson Sutton	Rackley W.A.R.	Chevrolet	23.655	114.141
28	14	Mini Tyrrell (R)	Kaulig Racing	Ram	23.684	114.001
29	22	Derek Lemke	Team Reaume	Ford	23.795	113.469
30	81	Kris Wright	McAnally–Hilgemann Racing	Chevrolet	23.805	113.422
31	4	Connor Hall	Niece Motorsports	Chevrolet	23.842	113.246
Qualified by owner's points
32	25	Elliott Sadler	Kaulig Racing	Ram	23.918	112.886
33	20	Mason Massey	McAnally–Hilgemann Racing	Chevrolet	23.986	112.566
34	76	Spencer Boyd	Freedom Racing Enterprises	Chevrolet	24.008	112.463
35	33	Frankie Muniz	Team Reaume	Ford	24.204	111.552
36	2	Dystany Spurlock	Team Reaume	Ford	24.773	108.990
Failed to qualify
37	27	Kasey Kleyn	Rackley W.A.R.	Chevrolet	24.192	111.607
38	93	Caleb Costner	Costner Motorsports	Chevrolet	24.202	111.561
39	90	Justin Carroll	TC Motorsports	Toyota	24.829	108.744
Official qualifying results
Official starting lineup

== Race ==
=== Race results ===
==== Stage Results ====
Stage One Laps: 70

Pos.	#	Driver	Team	Make	Pts
1	11	Kaden Honeycutt	Tricon Garage	Toyota	10
2	7	Shane van Gisbergen (i)	Spire Motorsports	Chevrolet	0
3	9	Grant Enfinger	CR7 Motorsports	Chevrolet	8
4	88	Ty Majeski	ThorSport Racing	Ford	7
5	34	Layne Riggs	Front Row Motorsports	Ford	6
6	38	Chandler Smith	Front Row Motorsports	Ford	5
7	91	Christian Eckes	McAnally–Hilgemann Racing	Chevrolet	4
8	18	Tyler Ankrum	McAnally–Hilgemann Racing	Chevrolet	3
9	77	Tristan McKee	Spire Motorsports	Chevrolet	2
10	1	Nick Leitz	Tricon Garage	Toyota	1

Stage Two Laps: 70

Pos.	#	Driver	Team	Make	Pts
1	11	Kaden Honeycutt	Tricon Garage	Toyota	10
2	34	Layne Riggs	Front Row Motorsports	Ford	9
3	9	Grant Enfinger	CR7 Motorsports	Chevrolet	8
4	91	Christian Eckes	McAnally–Hilgemann Racing	Chevrolet	7
5	7	Shane van Gisbergen (i)	Spire Motorsports	Chevrolet	0
6	38	Chandler Smith	Front Row Motorsports	Ford	5
7	1	Nick Leitz	Tricon Garage	Toyota	4
8	19	Daniel Hemric	McAnally–Hilgemann Racing	Chevrolet	3
9	5	Corey Heim	Tricon Garage	Toyota	2
10	98	Jake Garcia	ThorSport Racing	Ford	1

=== Final Stage Results ===
Stage Three Laps: 110

Fin	St	#	Driver	Team	Make	Laps	Led	Status	Pts
1	2	11	Kaden Honeycutt	Tricon Garage	Toyota	250	225	Running	76
2	16	5	Corey Heim	Tricon Garage	Toyota	250	0	Running	37
3	12	91	Christian Eckes	McAnally–Hilgemann Racing	Chevrolet	250	0	Running	45
4	1	7	Shane van Gisbergen (i)	Spire Motorsports	Chevrolet	250	2	Running	0
5	4	9	Grant Enfinger	CR7 Motorsports	Chevrolet	250	22	Running	48
6	21	98	Jake Garcia	ThorSport Racing	Ford	250	0	Running	32
7	3	38	Chandler Smith	Front Row Motorsports	Ford	250	0	Running	40
8	13	77	Tristan McKee	Spire Motorsports	Chevrolet	250	0	Running	31
9	14	17	Gio Ruggiero	Tricon Garage	Toyota	250	1	Running	28
10	20	19	Daniel Hemric	McAnally–Hilgemann Racing	Chevrolet	250	0	Running	30
11	10	18	Tyler Ankrum	McAnally–Hilgemann Racing	Chevrolet	250	0	Running	29
12	5	1	Nick Leitz	Tricon Garage	Toyota	250	0	Running	30
13	22	15	Tanner Gray	Tricon Garage	Toyota	250	0	Running	24
14	24	45	Landen Lewis	Niece Motorsports	Chevrolet	250	0	Running	23
15	11	34	Layne Riggs	Front Row Motorsports	Ford	250	0	Running	37
16	6	42	Parker Eatmon	Niece Motorsports	Chevrolet	250	0	Running	21
17	17	62	Leland Honeyman (Note: Due to a prior commitment scheduled for Saturday afternoon, Christopher Bell was replaced by Leland Honeyman for the race. Since Honeyman started the race, he is officially credited with a 17th place finish.)	Halmar Friesen Racing	Toyota	249	0	Running	20
18	15	99	Ben Rhodes	ThorSport Racing	Ford	249	0	Running	19
19	7	88	Ty Majeski	ThorSport Racing	Ford	249	0	Running	25
20	26	12	Brenden Queen (R)	Kaulig Racing	Ram	248	0	Running	17
21	18	10	Corey LaJoie	Kaulig Racing	Ram	248	0	Running	16
22	25	13	Cole Butcher (R)	ThorSport Racing	Ford	247	0	Running	15
23	8	44	Andrés Pérez de Lara	Niece Motorsports	Chevrolet	247	0	Running	14
24	29	22	Derek Lemke	Team Reaume	Ford	247	0	Running	13
25	33	20	Mason Massey	McAnally–Hilgemann Racing	Chevrolet	247	0	Running	12
26	27	26	Dawson Sutton	Rackley W.A.R.	Chevrolet	247	0	Running	11
27	19	16	Justin Haley	Kaulig Racing	Ram	247	0	Running	10
28	31	4	Connor Hall	Niece Motorsports	Chevrolet	247	0	Running	9
29	28	14	Mini Tyrrell (R)	Kaulig Racing	Ram	247	0	Running	8
30	35	33	Frankie Muniz	Team Reaume	Ford	246	0	Running	7
31	30	81	Kris Wright	McAnally–Hilgemann Racing	Chevrolet	246	0	Running	6
32	32	25	Elliott Sadler	Kaulig Racing	Ram	246	0	Running	5
33	23	56	Timmy Hill	Hill Motorsports	Toyota	246	0	Running	4
34	34	76	Spencer Boyd	Freedom Racing Enterprises	Chevrolet	244	0	Running	3
35	36	2	Dystany Spurlock	Team Reaume	Ford	239	0	Running	2
36	9	52	Stewart Friesen	Halmar Friesen Racing	Toyota	213	0	Accident	1
Official race results

=== Race statistics ===
- Lead changes: 6 among 4 different drivers
- Cautions/Laps: 3 for 24 laps
- Red flags: 0
- Time of race: 2 hours, 0 minutes and 46 seconds
- Average speed: 93.155 miles per hour (149.918 km/h)

== Standings after the race ==
Drivers' Championship standings

	Pos	Driver	Points
	1	Layne Riggs	753
	2	Kaden Honeycutt	692 (–61)
	3	Chandler Smith	603 (–150)
	4	Christian Eckes	541 (–212)
	5	Gio Ruggiero	519 (–234)
	6	Ty Majeski	471 (–282)
1	7	Grant Enfinger	439 (–314)
1	8	Ben Rhodes	427 (–326)
	9	Daniel Hemric	409 (–344)
1	10	Tyler Ankrum	394 (–359)
Official driver's standings

Manufacturers' Championship standings

Pos	Manufacturer	Points
1	Ford	701
2	Toyota	694 (–7)
3	Chevrolet	661 (–40)
4	Ram	430 (–271)

- Note: Only the first 10 positions are included for the driver standings.

Previous race: 2026 TSport 200	NASCAR Craftsman Truck Series; 2026 season	Next race: 2026 Team EJP 175
