= Mini Tyrrell =

American racing driver (born 2004)

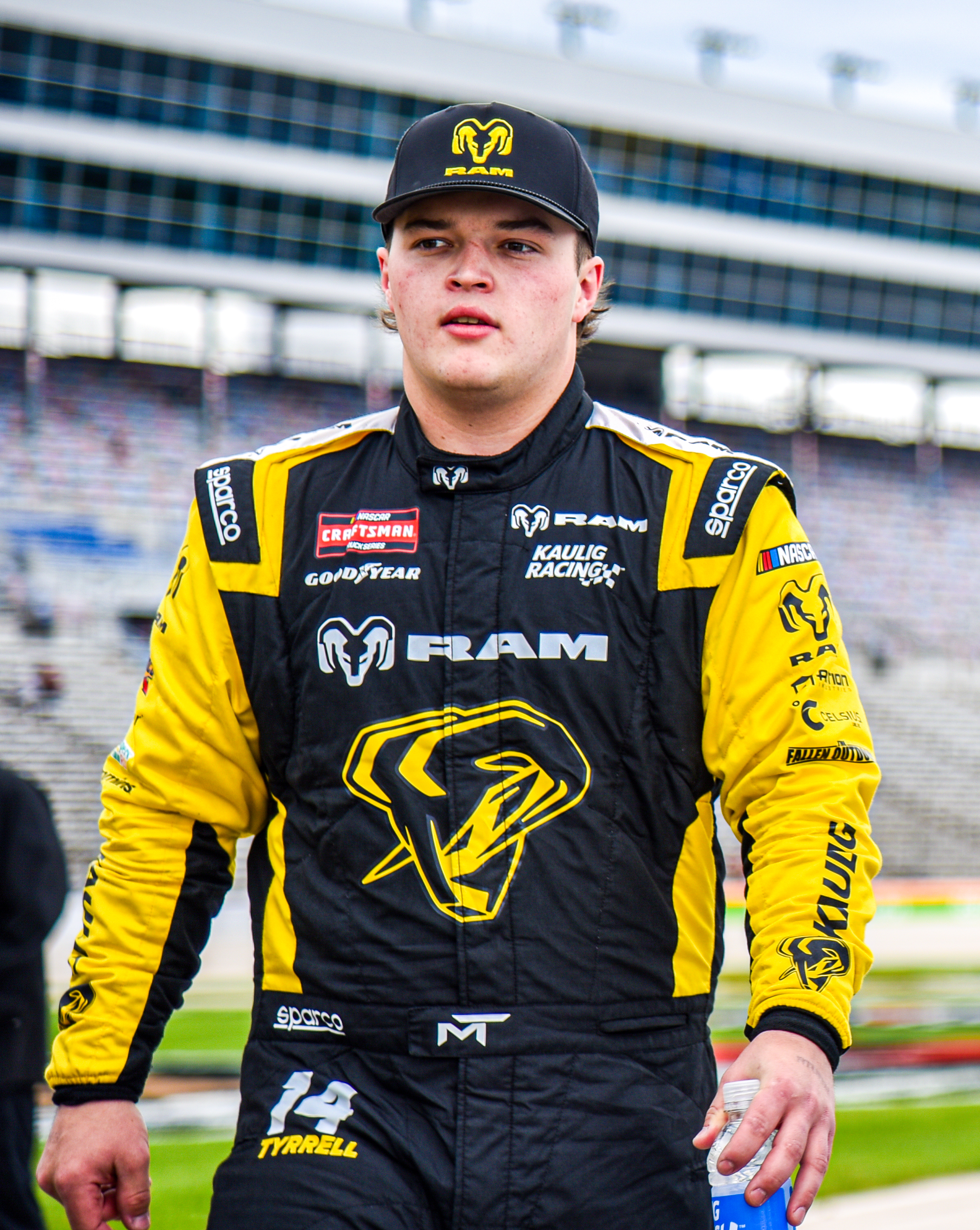
- Tyrrell at Texas Motor Speedway in 2026
- Born: Timothy Tyrrell Jr. September 8, 2004 (age 22); Manassas, Virginia, U.S.
- Achievements: 2025 Throwback Classic Winner
- Awards: 2019 CARS Late Model Stock Car Tour Rookie of the Year

NASCAR FedEx Freight Truck Series career
- 25 races run over 1 year
- Truck no., team: No. 14 (Kaulig Racing)
- 2026 position: 22nd
- Best finish: 22nd (2026)
- First race: 2026 Fresh From Florida 250 (Daytona)
- Last race: 2026 Craftsman 200 (Homestead)
| Wins | Top tens | Poles |
|---|---|---|
| 0 | 1 | 0 |

ARCA Menards Series career
- 1 race run over 1 year
- ARCA no., team: No. 17 (Cook Racing Technologies)
- Best finish: 136th (2026)
- First race: 2026 General Tire 200 (Daytona)
| Wins | Top tens | Poles |
|---|---|---|
| 0 | 0 | 0 |
- Statistics up to date as of November 6, 2026.

Timothy "Mini" Tyrrell Jr. (born September 8, 2004) is an American professional stock car racing driver. He competes full-time in the NASCAR Craftsman Truck Series, driving the No. 14 Ram 1500 for Kaulig Racing and part-time in the ARCA Menards Series, driving the No. 17 Chevrolet SS for Cook Racing Technologies. He has previously competed in the zMAX CARS Tour.

== Racing career ==
=== Early career ===
Tyrrell is a longtime competitor in the CARS Tour, having made his debut in 2018, and having won five races since 2021 and getting a best points finish of third in 2024.

Tyrrell has also competed in the Virginia Late Model Triple Crown Series, the USAC Eastern Midget Championship, the INEX Summer Shootout, and the NASCAR Weekly Series.

=== ARCA ===
On January 3, 2026, Cook Racing Technologies announced that Tyrrell will attempt to make his ARCA Menards Series debut for the team in 2026 in the season opener at Daytona in their No. 17 car. He would also participate with the team in the pre-season test for the series at Daytona International Speedway, where he set the 15th quickest time between the two sessions held.

=== Craftsman Truck Series ===
==== 2026 ====
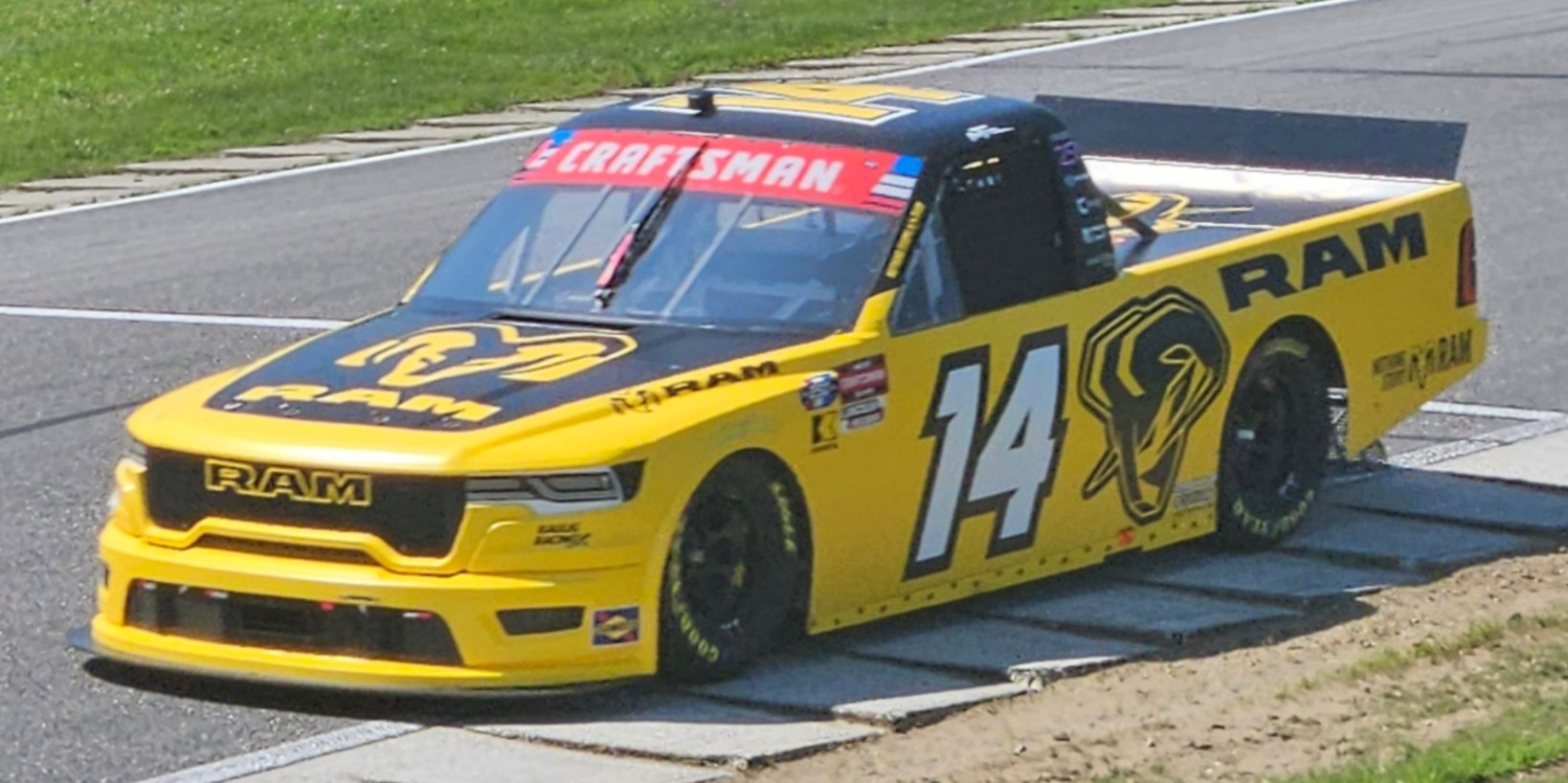
Tyrrell's No. 14 truck at Lime Rock Park in 2026.

Before the 2026 season, Tyrrell competed in Kaulig Racing's "Race For the Seat" show, competing against 14 other drivers to try to win a full-season ride in the team's No. 14 truck. He would ultimately win the competition and earn the full-time ride.

On November 6, 2026, Kaulig Racing CEO Chris Rice confirmed that Tyrrell would not return to the team for the 2027 season. At the time of the announcement, Tyrrell had recorded one top-ten finish, an eighth-place result at Watkins Glen International, and was 21st in the Truck Series standings entering the season finale. His plans for the 2027 season had not yet been announced.

== Personal life ==
Outside of racing, Tyrrell runs "Mini’s Mission", a non-profit organization that raises awareness and donations for those impacted by childhood cancer. The organization served as the race sponsor for the CARS Tour race at Dominion Raceway in 2025, a race that Tyrrell won.

== Motorsports career results ==
=== Racing career summary ===
| Season | Series | Team | Races | Wins | Top 5 | Top 10 | Points | Position |
|---|---|---|---|---|---|---|---|---|
| 2018 | CARS Late Model Stock Car Tour | Timmy Tyrrell Racing | 1 | 0 | 0 | 0 | 14 | 66th |
| 2019 | CARS Late Model Stock Car Tour | Timmy Tyrrell Racing | 11 | 0 | 1 | 6 | 238 | 6th |
| 2020 | CARS Late Model Stock Car Tour | Timmy Tyrrell Racing | 10 | 0 | 3 | 4 | 181 | 12th |
| 2021 | CARS Late Model Stock Car Tour | Timmy Tyrrell Racing | 13 | 1 | 2 | 5 | 285 | 9th |
| 2022 | CARS Late Model Stock Car Tour | Timmy Tyrrell Racing | 5 | 0 | 0 | 1 | 72 | 27th |
| 2023 | CARS Late Model Stock Car Tour | Timmy Tyrrell Racing | 16 | 0 | 1 | 4 | 272 | 13th |
| 2024 | CARS Late Model Stock Car Tour | Timmy Tyrrell Racing | 17 | 0 | 7 | 13 | 428 | **3rd** |
| 2025 | CARS Late Model Stock Car Tour | Timmy Tyrrell Racing | 15 | 3 | 5 | 6 | 467 | 5th |
| 2026 | CARS Late Model Stock Car Tour | Timmy Tyrrell Racing | 6 | 1 | 2 | 3 | 189 | 18th |
| 2026 | CARS Pro Late Model Tour | Cook Racing Technologies | 1 | 0 | 0 | 0 | 23 | 66th |
| 2026 | ARCA Menards Series | Cook Racing Technologies | 1 | 0 | 0 | 0 | 6 | 136th |
| 2026 | NASCAR Craftsman Truck Series | Kaulig Racing | 25 | 0 | 0 | 1 | 359 | 22nd |

=== NASCAR ===
(key) (Bold – Pole position awarded by qualifying time. Italics – Pole position earned by points standings or practice time. * – Most laps led.)

==== Craftsman Truck Series ====
NASCAR Craftsman Truck Series results
| Year | Team | No. | Make | 1 | 2 | 3 | 4 | 5 | 6 | 7 | 8 | 9 | 10 | 11 | 12 | 13 | 14 | 15 | 16 | 17 | 18 | 19 | 20 | 21 | 22 | 23 | 24 | 25 | NCTC | Pts | Ref |
|---|---|---|---|---|---|---|---|---|---|---|---|---|---|---|---|---|---|---|---|---|---|---|---|---|---|---|---|---|---|---|---|
| 2026 | Kaulig Racing | 14 | Ram | DAY; 19 | ATL; 19 | STP; 28 | DAR; 34 | CAR; 25 | BRI; 19 | TEX; 21 | GLN; 8 | DOV; 27 | CLT; 34 | NSH; 20 | MCH; 20 | COR; 11 | LRP; 24 | NWS; 28 | IRP; 27 | RCH; 29 | NHA; 23 | BRI; 26 | KAN; 18 | CLT; 15 | PHO; 29 | TAL; 28 | MAR; 17 | HOM; 23 | 22nd | 359 | |

^{*} Season still in progress
^{1} Ineligible for series points

=== ARCA Menards Series ===
(key) (Bold – Pole position awarded by qualifying time. Italics – Pole position earned by points standings or practice time. * – Most laps led.)

ARCA Menards Series results
| Year | Team | No. | Make | 1 | 2 | 3 | 4 | 5 | 6 | 7 | 8 | 9 | 10 | 11 | 12 | 13 | 14 | 15 | 16 | 17 | 18 | 19 | 20 | AMSC | Pts | Ref |
|---|---|---|---|---|---|---|---|---|---|---|---|---|---|---|---|---|---|---|---|---|---|---|---|---|---|---|
| 2026 | Cook Racing Technologies | 17 | Chevy | DAY; 38 | PHO | KAN | TAL | GLN | TOL | MCH | POC | BER | ELK | CHI | LRP | IRP | IOW | ISF | MAD | DSF | SLM | BRI | KAN | 136th | 6 | |

=== CARS Late Model Stock Car Tour ===
(key) (Bold – Pole position awarded by qualifying time. Italics – Pole position earned by points standings or practice time. * – Most laps led. ** – All laps led.)

CARS Late Model Stock Car Tour results
| Year | Team | No. | Make | 1 | 2 | 3 | 4 | 5 | 6 | 7 | 8 | 9 | 10 | 11 | 12 | 13 | 14 | 15 | 16 | 17 | CLMSCTC | Pts | Ref |
|---|---|---|---|---|---|---|---|---|---|---|---|---|---|---|---|---|---|---|---|---|---|---|---|
| 2018 | Timmy Tyrrell Racing | 81 | Chevy | TCM | MYB | ROU | HCY | BRI | ACE | CCS | KPT | HCY | WKS | ROU | SBO; 19 | | | | | | 66th | 14 | |
| 2019 | Timmy Tyrrell Racing | 81 | Chevy | SNM; 19 | HCY; 12 | ROU; 8 | ACE; 8 | MMS; 8 | LGY; 15 | DOM; 4 | CCS; 8 | | ROU; 11 | SBO; 8 | | | | | | | 6th | 238 | |
| 2019 | Timmy Tyrrell Racing | 24 | Chevy | | | | | | | | | HCY; 24 | | | | | | | | | 6th | 238 | |
| 2020 | Timmy Tyrrell Racing | 81 | Chevy | SNM; 24 | ACE; 26 | HCY; 25 | **HCY**; 3 | DOM; 2 | FCS; 17 | LGY; 4 | CCS; 12 | FLO; 8 | GRE; 29 | | | | | | | | 12th | 181 | |
| 2021 | Timmy Tyrrell Racing | 81 | Chevy | DIL; 17 | HCY; 7 | OCS; 13 | ACE; 19 | CRW; 14 | LGY; 6 | DOM; 6 | | MMS; 19 | **TCM**; 1* | FLC; 15 | WKS; 11 | SBO; 18 | | | | | 9th | 285 | |
| 2021 | Timmy Tyrrell Racing | 7 | Chevy | | | | | | | | HCY; 4* | | | | | | | | | | 9th | 285 | |
| 2022 | Timmy Tyrrell Racing | 81 | Chevy | CRW | HCY | GRE | AAS | FCS | LGY | DOM | HCY | ACE; 24 | MMS | NWS; 22 | TCM; 26 | ACE; 12 | SBO; 10 | CRW | | | 27th | 72 | |
| 2023 | Timmy Tyrrell Racing | 81 | Chevy | SNM; 22 | FLC; 6 | HCY; 25 | ACE; 14 | NWS; 32 | LGY; 12 | DOM; 3 | CRW; 9 | | ACE; 15 | TCM; 8 | WKS; 11 | AAS; 13 | SBO; 29 | TCM; 16 | CRW; 25 | | 13th | 272 | |
| 2023 | Timmy Tyrrell Racing | 56N | Chevy | | | | | | | | | HCY; 19 | | | | | | | | | 13th | 272 | |
| 2024 | Timmy Tyrrell Racing | 81 | Chevy | SNM; 7 | HCY; 5 | AAS; 2 | OCS; 18 | ACE; 8 | | LGY; 13 | | CRW; 22 | HCY; 7 | | | | | | | | 3rd | 428 | |
| 2024 | Timmy Tyrrell Racing | 81 | Toyota | | | | | | TCM; 10 | | DOM; 5 | | | NWS; 3 | ACE; 2 | WCS; 4 | FLC; 6 | SBO; 6 | TCM; 15 | NWS; 3 | 3rd | 428 | |
| 2025 | Timmy Tyrrell Racing | 81 | Toyota | AAS; 21 | WCS; 1** | CDL; 2* | OCS; 26 | ACE; 17 | NWS; 3 | LGY; 20 | **DOM**; 1** | CRW; 24* | HCY; 1 | AND; 6 | FLC; 17 | **SBO**; 17 | TCM; 20 | NWS; 15 | | | 5th | 467 | |
| 2026 | Timmy Tyrrell Racing | 81 | Dodge | SNM | **WCS**; 21* | NSV | CRW; 13 | ACE | LGY | DOM; 1 | NWS; 21 | HCY; 10 | AND | FLC | TCM; 5 | NPS | SBO | | | | 18th | 189 | |

=== CARS Pro Late Model Tour ===
(key)

CARS Pro Late Model Tour results
| Year | Team | No. | Make | 1 | 2 | 3 | 4 | 5 | 6 | 7 | 8 | 9 | 10 | 11 | CPLMTC | Pts | Ref |
|---|---|---|---|---|---|---|---|---|---|---|---|---|---|---|---|---|---|
| 2026 | Cook Racing Technologies | 17 | Chevy | SNM | NSV | CRW | ACE | NWS; 19 | HCY | AND | FLC | TCM | NPS | SBO | 66th | 23 | |
