= 2026 NASCAR Craftsman Truck Series =

American motorsport season

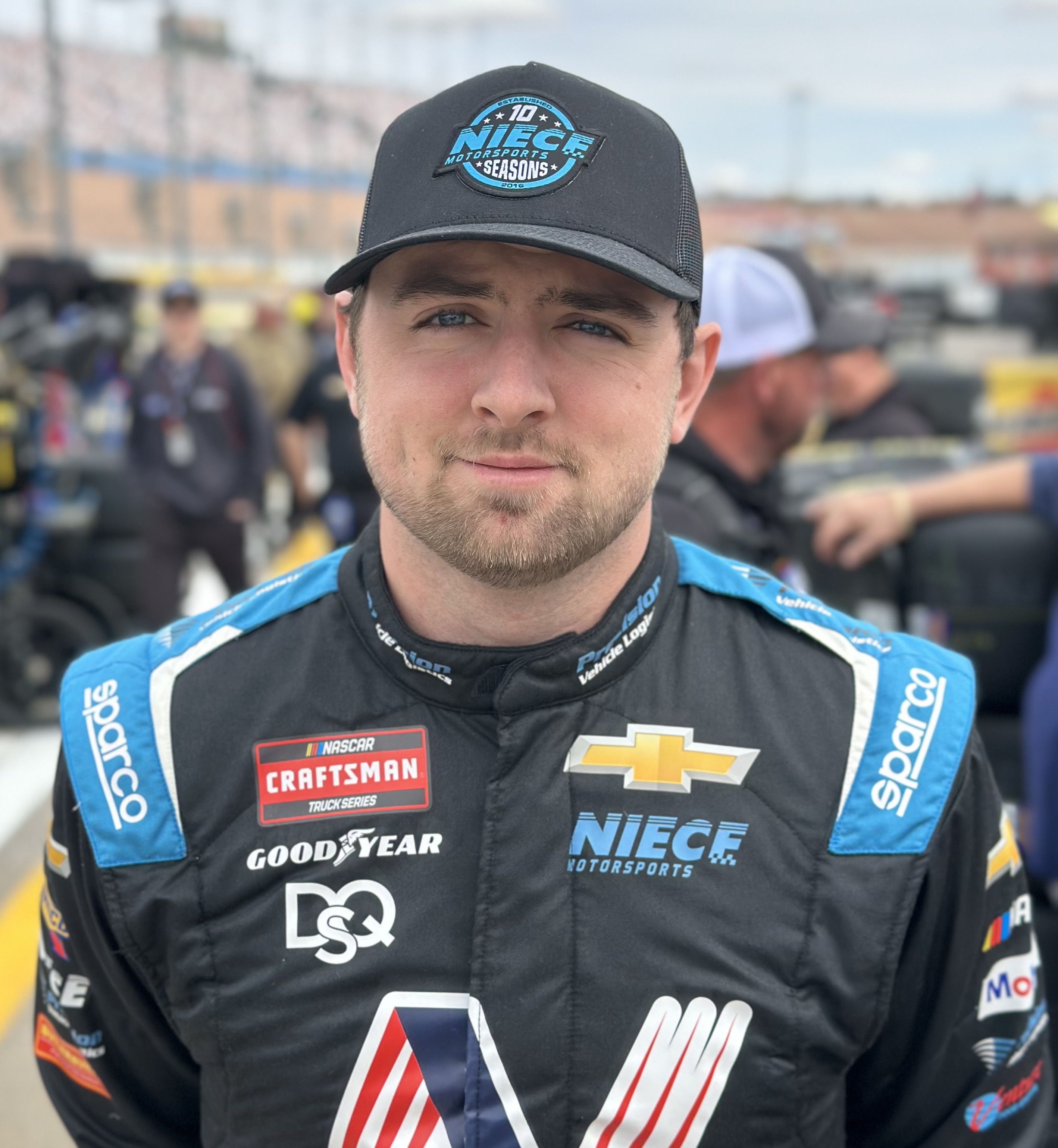
Kaden Honeycutt, the 2026 NASCAR Craftsman Truck Series champion.

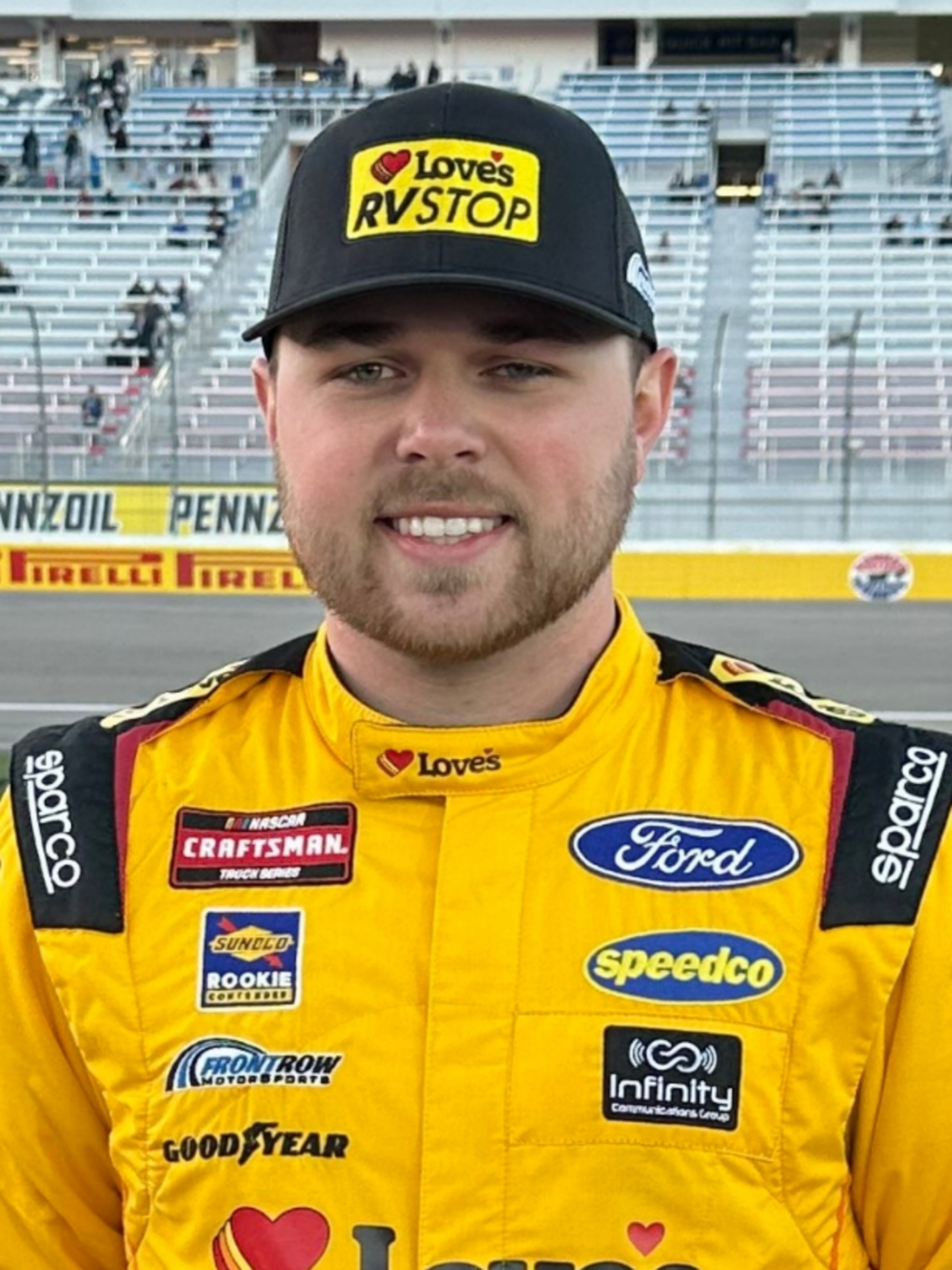
Layne Riggs, the No. 1 seed, finished runner up in the standings.

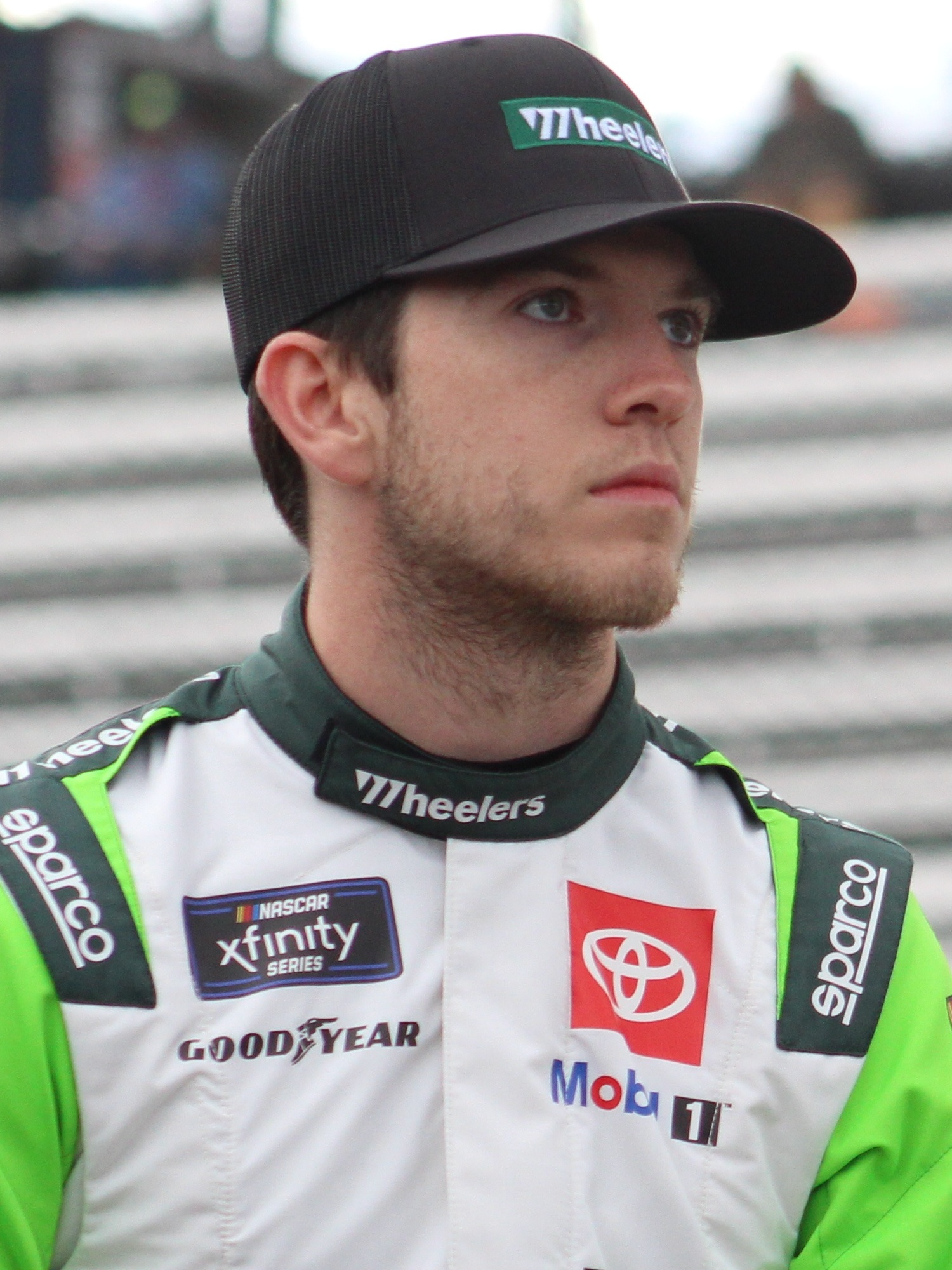
Chandler Smith finished third in the championship standings.

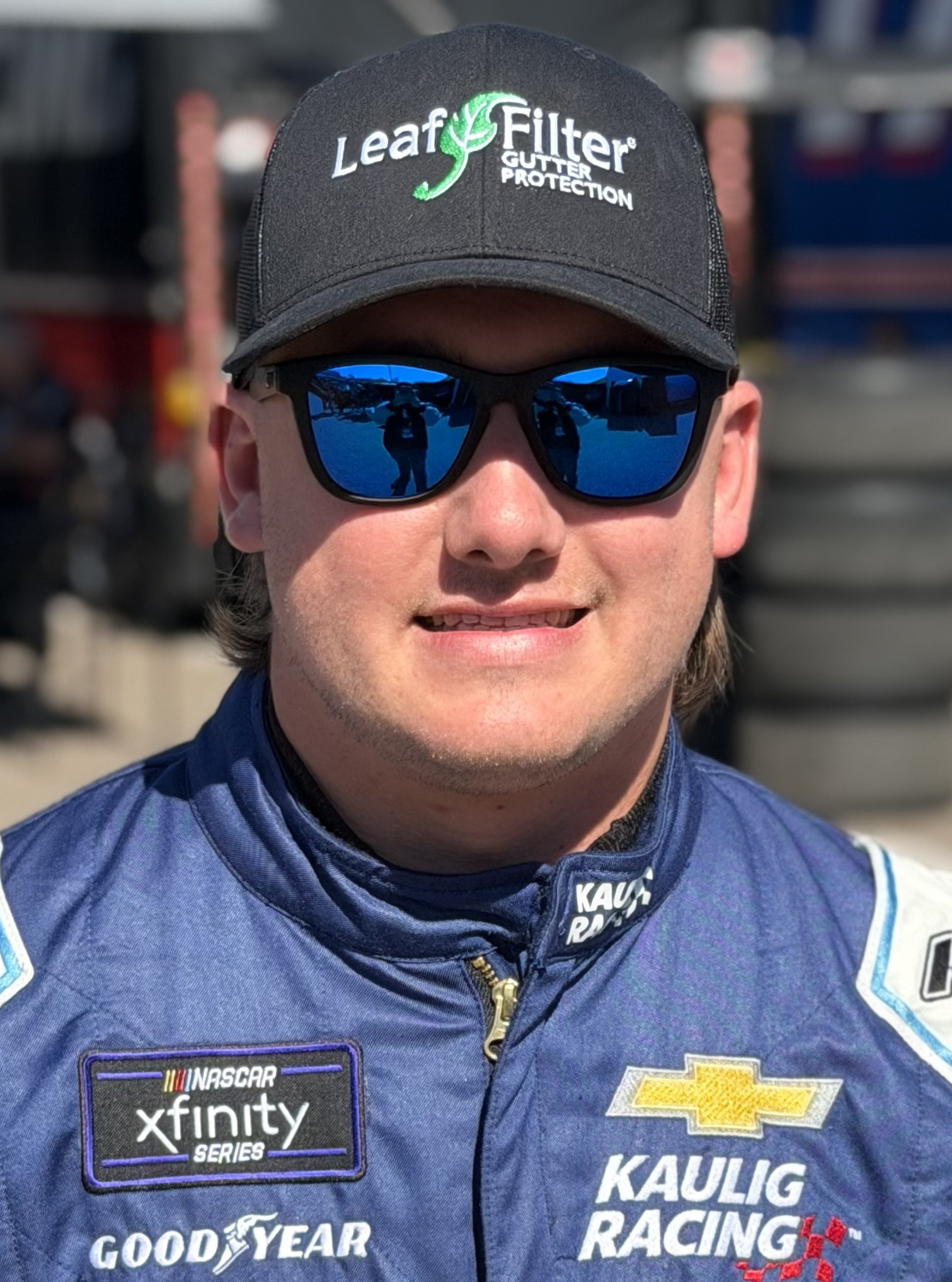
Brenden Queen, the Rookie of the Year.

The Tricon Garage No. 11 truck driven by Kaden Honeycutt won the owners' championship.

Ford won the manufacturers' championship with 1053 points and 11 wins.

The 2026 NASCAR Craftsman Truck Series season was the 32nd season of the NASCAR Craftsman Truck Series, a pickup truck racing series sanctioned by NASCAR in the United States. The season started on February 13 with the Fresh From Florida 250 at Daytona International Speedway and ended at Homestead–Miami Speedway on November 6.

This was the first season with Ram as a manufacturer since the 2012 season. It was the first season since 2000 without Matt Crafton competing full-time after his retirement from full-time racing after the 2025 season. This would also be the first season since 2008 to have Jimmie Johnson run in the Truck Series, as he ran the race at Coronado. This was also the first season since 2005 to have Tony Stewart as he ran the season opening race at Daytona. It was the last season to feature Kyle Busch, the winningest driver in series history, as he would die from sepsis on May 21, 2026, nearly a week after he won his final race at Dover Motor Speedway.

Corey Heim, the reigning Craftsman Truck Series champion, opted not to defend his title, instead switching to a part-time campaign with his team Tricon Garage. For the first time in series history, the Chase served as the championship format, replacing the elimination-style playoff format after a decade of service. After the Team EJP 175 at New Hampshire Motor Speedway, Layne Riggs of Front Row Motorsports clinched the No. 1 seed for The Chase. Within the Chase, Kaden Honeycutt of Tricon Garage battled Riggs in a fight that went down to the final race of the season at Homestead-Miami Speedway, in which he would win the championship with 5 wins across the season and every Chase race finished within the top 15.

This season was the final season with Craftsman as the title sponsor of the series, as FedEx Freight will replace the title sponsor starting in the next season.

== Teams and drivers ==
=== Full-time teams ===
Manufacturer	Team	No.	Driver	Crew chief	References
Chevrolet	CR7 Motorsports	9	Grant Enfinger	Derek Smith	
Chevrolet	Freedom Racing Enterprises	76	Spencer Boyd 18	Mike Hillman Sr. 20; Ryan London 5	
Chevrolet	Freedom Racing Enterprises	76	Nathan Nicholson 4	Mike Hillman Sr. 20; Ryan London 5	
Chevrolet	Freedom Racing Enterprises	76	Louis Foster 1	Mike Hillman Sr. 20; Ryan London 5	
Chevrolet	Freedom Racing Enterprises	76	Caden Kvapil 1	Mike Hillman Sr. 20; Ryan London 5	
Chevrolet	Freedom Racing Enterprises	76	Ben Maier 1	Mike Hillman Sr. 20; Ryan London 5	
Chevrolet	McAnally–Hilgemann Racing	18	Tyler Ankrum	Mark Hillman	
Chevrolet	McAnally–Hilgemann Racing	19	Daniel Hemric	Kevin Bellicourt	
Chevrolet	McAnally–Hilgemann Racing	81	Kris Wright	Darren Fraley	
Chevrolet	McAnally–Hilgemann Racing	91	Christian Eckes	Dave Elenz	
Chevrolet	Niece Motorsports	42	Travis Pastrana 1	Landon Polinski	
Chevrolet	Niece Motorsports	42	Tyler Reif 10	Landon Polinski	
Chevrolet	Niece Motorsports	42	Conner Jones 5	Landon Polinski	
Chevrolet	Niece Motorsports	42	Parker Eatmon 7	Landon Polinski	
Chevrolet	Niece Motorsports	42	Ricky Stenhouse Jr. 1	Landon Polinski	
Chevrolet	Niece Motorsports	42	Ben Maier 1	Landon Polinski	
Chevrolet	Niece Motorsports	44	Andrés Pérez de Lara	Wally Rogers	
Chevrolet	Niece Motorsports	45	Ricky Stenhouse Jr. 2	Phil Gould	
Chevrolet	Niece Motorsports	45	Ross Chastain 8	Phil Gould	
Chevrolet	Niece Motorsports	45	Landen Lewis 15	Phil Gould	
Chevrolet	Spire Motorsports	7	Michael McDowell 1	Brian Pattie	
Chevrolet	Spire Motorsports	7	Kyle Busch 4	Brian Pattie	
Chevrolet	Spire Motorsports	7	Connor Mosack 12	Brian Pattie	
Chevrolet	Spire Motorsports	7	Sammy Smith 3	Brian Pattie	
Chevrolet	Spire Motorsports	7	Corey Day 1	Brian Pattie	
Chevrolet	Spire Motorsports	7	Rajah Caruth 1	Brian Pattie	
Chevrolet	Spire Motorsports	7	Chase Elliott 1	Brian Pattie	
Chevrolet	Spire Motorsports	7	Shane van Gisbergen 1	Brian Pattie	
Chevrolet	Spire Motorsports	7	Brennan Poole 1	Brian Pattie	
Chevrolet	Spire Motorsports	77	Carson Hocevar 10	Chad Walter	
Chevrolet	Spire Motorsports	77	James Hinchcliffe 1	Chad Walter	
Chevrolet	Spire Motorsports	77	Connor Zilisch 1	Chad Walter	
Chevrolet	Spire Motorsports	77	Jesse Love 1	Chad Walter	
Chevrolet	Spire Motorsports	77	Justin Marks 1	Chad Walter	
Chevrolet	Spire Motorsports	77	Parker Kligerman 1	Chad Walter	
Chevrolet	Spire Motorsports	77	Nick Sanchez 3	Chad Walter	
Chevrolet	Spire Motorsports	77	Tristan McKee 5	Chad Walter	
Chevrolet	Spire Motorsports	77	Rajah Caruth 1	Chad Walter	
Chevrolet	Spire Motorsports	77	Austin Green 1	Chad Walter	
Ford	Front Row Motorsports	34	Layne Riggs	Dylan Cappello	
Ford	Front Row Motorsports	38	Chandler Smith	Jon Leonard	
Ford	Team Reaume	2	Jason White 2	Todd Myers	
Ford	Team Reaume	2	Clayton Green 5	Todd Myers	
Ford	Team Reaume	2	Carter Fartuch 1	Todd Myers	
Ford	Team Reaume	2	Luke Baldwin 8	Todd Myers	
Ford	Team Reaume	2	Jackson Lee 3	Todd Myers	
Ford	Team Reaume	2	Morgen Baird 1	Todd Myers	
Ford	Team Reaume	2	Jackson Macenko 1	Todd Myers	
Ford	Team Reaume	2	Dystany Spurlock 1 (Note: Entry is fielded in a collaboration with MBM Motorsports.)	Todd Myers	
Ford	Team Reaume	2	Stephen Mallozzi 1	Todd Myers	
Ford	Team Reaume	2	Monty Tipton 2	Todd Myers	
Ford	Team Reaume	2	Timmy Hill 1	Todd Myers	
Ford	Team Reaume	22	Josh Reaume 9	Will Camilleri 6 Kevin Johnson 19	
Ford	Team Reaume	22	Jackson Lee 1	Will Camilleri 6 Kevin Johnson 19	
Ford	Team Reaume	22	Clayton Green 7	Will Camilleri 6 Kevin Johnson 19	
Ford	Team Reaume	22	Natalie Decker 2	Will Camilleri 6 Kevin Johnson 19	
Ford	Team Reaume	22	Derek Lemke 2	Will Camilleri 6 Kevin Johnson 19	
Ford	Team Reaume	22	Austin Varco 1	Will Camilleri 6 Kevin Johnson 19	
Ford	Team Reaume	22	Monty Tipton 1	Will Camilleri 6 Kevin Johnson 19	
Ford	Team Reaume	22	Patrick Emerling 1	Will Camilleri 6 Kevin Johnson 19	
Ford	Team Reaume	22	Jackson Macenko 1	Will Camilleri 6 Kevin Johnson 19	
Ford	Team Reaume	33	Frankie Muniz 21 (Note: At New Hampshire (race 18), Frankie Muniz qualified the No. 33 truck but after Luke Baldwin failed to qualify in the No. 2 truck, Muniz would be replaced by Baldwin.)	Pedro Lopez	
Ford	Team Reaume	33	Stephen Mallozzi 1	Pedro Lopez	
Ford	Team Reaume	33	Luke Baldwin 1	Pedro Lopez	
Ford	Team Reaume	33	Josh Reaume 2	Pedro Lopez	
Ford	ThorSport Racing	13	Cole Butcher (R)	Rich Lushes	
Ford	ThorSport Racing	88	Ty Majeski	Joe Shear Jr. 24; Jeriod Prince 1	
Ford	ThorSport Racing	98	Jake Garcia	Josh Hankish	
Ford	ThorSport Racing	99	Ben Rhodes	Eddie Troconis 2 Vance Haefele 1 Cale Gale 22	
Ram	Kaulig Racing	10	Daniel Dye 3	Dan Stillman 13; Alex Yontz 12	
Ram	Kaulig Racing	10	A. J. Allmendinger 1	Dan Stillman 13; Alex Yontz 12	
Ram	Kaulig Racing	10	Corey LaJoie 21	Dan Stillman 13; Alex Yontz 12	
Ram	Kaulig Racing	12	Brenden Queen (R)	Eddie Pardue	
Ram	Kaulig Racing	14	Mini Tyrrell (R)	Bruce Cook 16; Lennie Chandler 2 Chad Kendrick 7	
Ram	Kaulig Racing	16	Justin Haley	Mike Hillman Jr.	
Ram	Kaulig Racing	25	Tony Stewart 2	Alex Yontz 13; Dan Stillman 12	
Ram	Kaulig Racing	25	Ty Dillon 2	Alex Yontz 13; Dan Stillman 12	
Ram	Kaulig Racing	25	Colin Braun 3	Alex Yontz 13; Dan Stillman 12	
Ram	Kaulig Racing	25	Corey LaJoie 1	Alex Yontz 13; Dan Stillman 12	
Ram	Kaulig Racing	25	Carson Ferguson 3	Alex Yontz 13; Dan Stillman 12	
Ram	Kaulig Racing	25	Parker Kligerman 3	Alex Yontz 13; Dan Stillman 12	
Ram	Kaulig Racing	25	A. J. Allmendinger 1	Alex Yontz 13; Dan Stillman 12	
Ram	Kaulig Racing	25	Clint Bowyer 1	Alex Yontz 13; Dan Stillman 12	
Ram	Kaulig Racing	25	Travis Pastrana 1	Alex Yontz 13; Dan Stillman 12	
Ram	Kaulig Racing	25	Jamie McMurray 1	Alex Yontz 13; Dan Stillman 12	
Ram	Kaulig Racing	25	Ryan Newman 1	Alex Yontz 13; Dan Stillman 12	
Ram	Kaulig Racing	25	Conor Daly 3	Alex Yontz 13; Dan Stillman 12	
Ram	Kaulig Racing	25	Elliott Sadler 1	Alex Yontz 13; Dan Stillman 12	
Ram	Kaulig Racing	25	Regan Smith 2	Alex Yontz 13; Dan Stillman 12	
Toyota	Halmar Friesen Racing	52	Stewart Friesen	Dustin Dunn 23; Bruce Cook 1 Jimmy Villeneuve 1	
Toyota	Halmar Friesen Racing	62	John Hunter Nemechek 2	Jimmy Villeneuve 23; William Hartman 1 Dustin Dunn 1	
Toyota	Halmar Friesen Racing	62	Wesley Slimp 3	Jimmy Villeneuve 23; William Hartman 1 Dustin Dunn 1	
Toyota	Halmar Friesen Racing	62	Christopher Bell 7 (Note: At Richmond (race 17), Christopher Bell qualified the No. 62 truck but after the race was postponed to the same day as the Cup series race, Bell decided not to run the Truck Series race to focus on the Cup Series race and was replaced by Leland Honeyman, which is why they are both listed in the No. 62 truck for that race.)	Jimmy Villeneuve 23; William Hartman 1 Dustin Dunn 1	
Toyota	Halmar Friesen Racing	62	Mike Christopher Jr. 2	Jimmy Villeneuve 23; William Hartman 1 Dustin Dunn 1	
Toyota	Halmar Friesen Racing	62	Cory Roper 2	Jimmy Villeneuve 23; William Hartman 1 Dustin Dunn 1	
Toyota	Halmar Friesen Racing	62	Leland Honeyman 6	Jimmy Villeneuve 23; William Hartman 1 Dustin Dunn 1	
Toyota	Halmar Friesen Racing	62	Parker Retzlaff 1	Jimmy Villeneuve 23; William Hartman 1 Dustin Dunn 1	
Toyota	Halmar Friesen Racing	62	Kaz Grala 1	Jimmy Villeneuve 23; William Hartman 1 Dustin Dunn 1	
Toyota	Halmar Friesen Racing	62	William Sawalich 1	Jimmy Villeneuve 23; William Hartman 1 Dustin Dunn 1	
Toyota	Halmar Friesen Racing	62	Kasey Kleyn 1	Jimmy Villeneuve 23; William Hartman 1 Dustin Dunn 1	
Toyota	Tricon Garage	1	Taylor Gray 1	Jerame Donley 24; Jimmie Johnson 1	
Toyota	Tricon Garage	1	Corey Heim 6	Jerame Donley 24; Jimmie Johnson 1	
Toyota	Tricon Garage	1	Dario Franchitti 1	Jerame Donley 24; Jimmie Johnson 1	
Toyota	Tricon Garage	1	William Sawalich 1	Jerame Donley 24; Jimmie Johnson 1	
Toyota	Tricon Garage	1	Brandon Jones 4	Jerame Donley 24; Jimmie Johnson 1	
Toyota	Tricon Garage	1	Brent Crews 3	Jerame Donley 24; Jimmie Johnson 1	
Toyota	Tricon Garage	1	Jimmie Johnson 1	Jerame Donley 24; Jimmie Johnson 1	
Toyota	Tricon Garage	1	Thomas Annunziata 1	Jerame Donley 24; Jimmie Johnson 1	
Toyota	Tricon Garage	1	Nick Leitz 4	Jerame Donley 24; Jimmie Johnson 1	
Toyota	Tricon Garage	1	Gavan Boschele 3	Jerame Donley 24; Jimmie Johnson 1	
Toyota	Tricon Garage	5	Nick Leitz 1	Seth Smith	
Toyota	Tricon Garage	5	Adam Andretti 5	Seth Smith	
Toyota	Tricon Garage	5	Corey Heim 3	Seth Smith	
Toyota	Tricon Garage	5	Chase Briscoe 1	Seth Smith	
Toyota	Tricon Garage	5	William Sawalich 5	Seth Smith	
Toyota	Tricon Garage	5	Spencer Davis 2	Seth Smith	
Toyota	Tricon Garage	5	Graham Doyle 1	Seth Smith	
Toyota	Tricon Garage	5	Harrison Burton 1	Seth Smith	
Toyota	Tricon Garage	5	John Hunter Nemechek 1	Seth Smith	
Toyota	Tricon Garage	5	Bayley Currey 2	Seth Smith	
Toyota	Tricon Garage	5	Brent Crews 1	Seth Smith	
Toyota	Tricon Garage	5	Thomas Annunziata 1	Seth Smith	
Toyota	Tricon Garage	11	Kaden Honeycutt	David Stewart 3 Scott Zipadelli 22	
Toyota	Tricon Garage	15	Tanner Gray	Jeff Hensley 21; Jacob Hampton 4	
Toyota	Tricon Garage	17	Gio Ruggiero	Jeff Stankiewicz	

=== Limited schedule ===
Manufacturer	Team	No.	Driver	Crew chief	Races	References
Chevrolet	Costner Motorsports	93	Caleb Costner	Derek Kearns	10	
Chevrolet	Costner Motorsports	93	Cassten Everidge	Derek Kearns	1	
Chevrolet	Costner Motorsports	93	D. L. Wilson	Derek Kearns	1	
Chevrolet	CR7 Motorsports	97	Jason Kitzmiller	Michael Shelton	1	
Chevrolet	FDNY Racing	28	Bryan Dauzat	Jim Rosenblum	2	
Chevrolet	GK Racing	95	Clay Greenfield	Trip Bruce	2	
Chevrolet	Henderson Motorsports	75	Corey LaJoie	Chris Carrier	1	
Chevrolet	Henderson Motorsports	75	Parker Kligerman	Chris Carrier	1	
Chevrolet	Henderson Motorsports	75	Landon Huffman	Chris Carrier	1	
Chevrolet	Henderson Motorsports	75	Nick Sanchez	Chris Carrier	1	
Chevrolet	McAnally–Hilgemann Racing	20	Toni Breidinger	Ty Joiner 1 Dewey Townsend IV 9	2	
Chevrolet	McAnally–Hilgemann Racing	20	Daniel Dye	Ty Joiner 1 Dewey Townsend IV 9	4	
Chevrolet	McAnally–Hilgemann Racing	20	Brendan Gaughan	Ty Joiner 1 Dewey Townsend IV 9	1	
Chevrolet	McAnally–Hilgemann Racing	20	Mason Massey	Ty Joiner 1 Dewey Townsend IV 9	3	
Chevrolet	Niece Motorsports	4	Garrett Mitchell	Mike Shiplett	3	
Chevrolet	Niece Motorsports	4	Ben Maier	Mike Shiplett	1	
Chevrolet	Niece Motorsports	4	Connor Hall	Mike Shiplett	6	
Chevrolet	Niece Motorsports	4	Ricky Stenhouse Jr.	Mike Shiplett	2	
Chevrolet	Niece Motorsports	4	Shane van Gisbergen	Mike Shiplett	1	
Chevrolet	Niece Motorsports	4	Stefan Parsons	Mike Shiplett	1	
Chevrolet	Niece Motorsports	4	Donovan Strauss	Mike Shiplett	2	
Chevrolet	Niece Motorsports	4	Matt Mills	Mike Shiplett	1	
Chevrolet	Niece Motorsports	4	Conner Jones	Mike Shiplett	1	
Chevrolet	Norm Benning Racing	6	Norm Benning	Rick Todd	2	
Chevrolet	Rackley W.A.R.	26	Dawson Sutton	Chad Kendrick 18; Willie Allen 4 Bruce Cook 1	22 (Note: At New Hampshire (race 18), Toni Breidinger qualified the No. 26 truck, but after Dawson Sutton failed to qualify in the No. 27 truck, Breidinger was replaced by Sutton.)	
Chevrolet	Rackley W.A.R.	26	Toni Breidinger	Chad Kendrick 18; Willie Allen 4 Bruce Cook 1	2	
Chevrolet	Rackley W.A.R.	27	Toni Breidinger	Willie Allen 1 Jack Johnston II 6	5	
Chevrolet	Rackley W.A.R.	27	Kasey Kleyn	Willie Allen 1 Jack Johnston II 6	2	
Chevrolet	Rackley W.A.R.	27	Dawson Sutton	Willie Allen 1 Jack Johnston II 6	1	
Chevrolet	Spire Motorsports	71	Daniel Suárez	Kevin Manion	1	
Chevrolet	Spire Motorsports	71	Connor Zilisch	Kevin Manion	2	
Chevrolet	Spire Motorsports	71	Shane van Gisbergen	Kevin Manion	2	
Ford	Team Reaume	23	Jackson Lee	Josh Reaume	1	
Ford	ThorSport Racing	66	Matt Crafton	Bud Haefele	1	
Toyota	Greg Van Alst Motorsports	35	Greg Van Alst	Kevin Shannon	1	
Toyota	Halmar Friesen Racing	72	Mike Christopher Jr.	Jimmy Villeneuve	1	
Toyota	Hill Motorsports	56	Timmy Hill	Terry Elmore	15	
Chevrolet 1 Toyota 7	TC Motorsports	90	Justin Carroll	Terry Carroll	8	
Ford 6 Toyota 1 Ram 3	MBM Motorsports	69	Tyler Tomassi	Jason Miller 9 Carl Long 1	3	
Ford 6 Toyota 1 Ram 3	MBM Motorsports	69	Derek White	Jason Miller 9 Carl Long 1	2	
Ford 6 Toyota 1 Ram 3	MBM Motorsports	69	Jonathan Shafer	Jason Miller 9 Carl Long 1	3	
Ford 6 Toyota 1 Ram 3	MBM Motorsports	69	Dystany Spurlock	Jason Miller 9 Carl Long 1	2	

=== Team changes ===
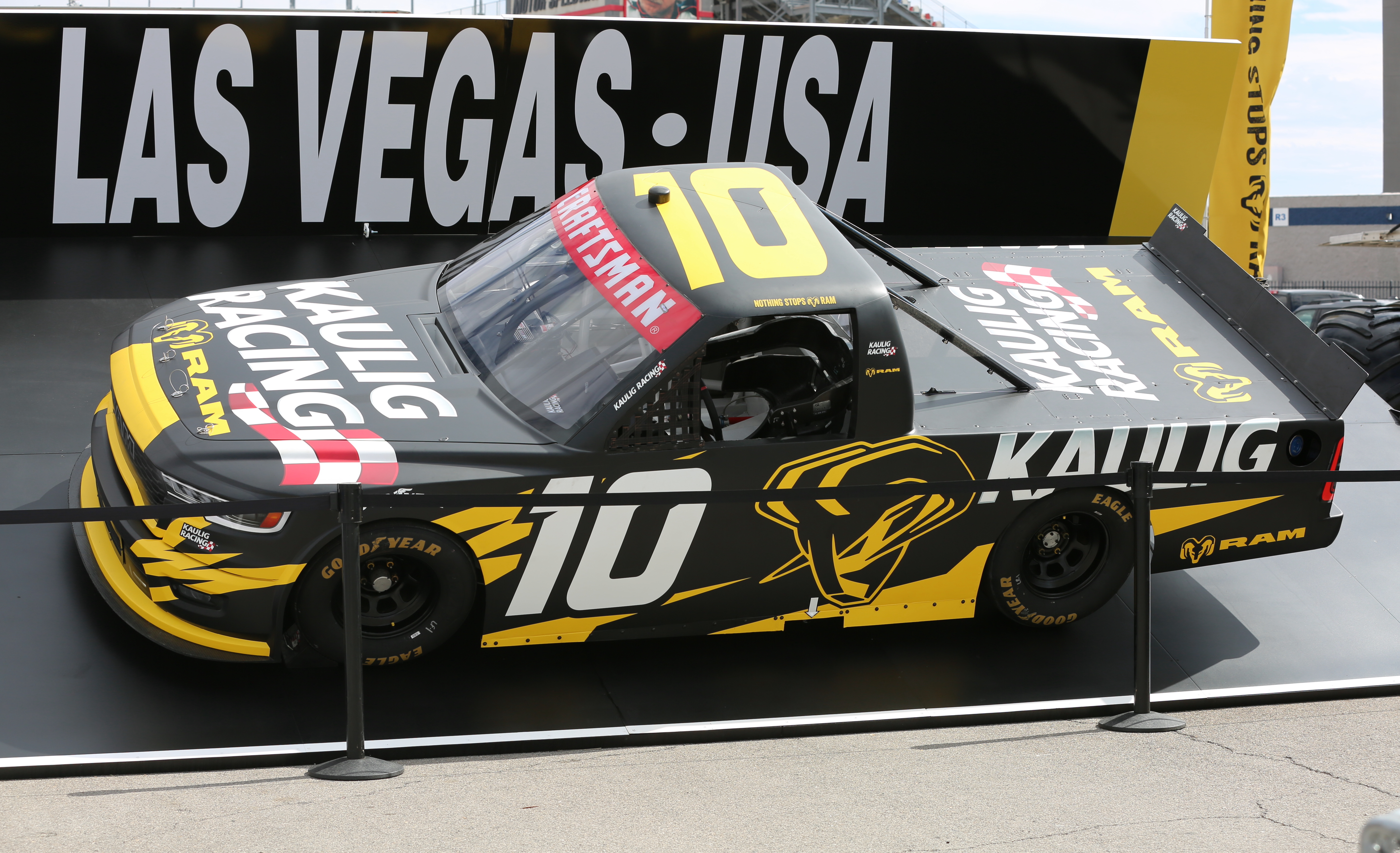
A showtruck for a Kaulig Racing 2026 Ram at the 2025 South Point 400.

- Kaulig Racing, which has fielded entries in the Cup Series since 2020 and the Xfinity Series since 2016, will debut in the Truck Series for the first time in 2026 and be the flagship team for Ram, which is re-entering the sport in 2026 for the first time since 2012.
- Halmar Friesen Racing will field two full-time trucks in 2025 with the No. 62 expanding from being fielded part-time to full-time.
- Reaume Brothers Racing announced that they would rebrand to Team Reaume starting in 2026.
- Rackley W.A.R. will field a second truck part-time in 2026, the No. 27, and it will be driven by Toni Breidinger. The team did not field a part-time second truck in 2025 but they did in 2024.
- Caleb Costner, who competed part-time in the series in 2025 in the Mike Harmon Racing No. 74 truck, will bring his ARCA Menards Series team, Costner Motorsports, to the Truck Series in 2026 and they will field the No. 93 truck part-time.
- Niece Motorsports announced that they would renumber their No. 41 truck to the No. 4 for 2026.

=== Driver changes ===
==== Leaving series ====
Rajah Caruth moved up to the NASCAR O'Reilly Auto Parts Series in 2026, driving full-time between JR Motorsports and Jordan Anderson Racing.

==== Joining series ====
Daniel Dye returned to the Truck Series full-time after driving full-time in the Xfinity Series for one year in 2025. Justin Haley returned to the Truck Series full-time for the first time since 2018. He competed in the NASCAR Cup Series full-time from 2022 to 2025. Christian Eckes returned to the Truck Series full-time after driving full-time in the Xfinity Series for one year in 2025. He returned to McAnally–Hilgemann Racing, the team he drove for full-time in 2023 and 2024.

==== Rookies ====
Cole Butcher competed full-time for Thorsport Racing. Brenden Queen, the 2025 ARCA Menards Series champion, competed full-time for Kaulig Racing. Mini Tyrrell, winner of Ram: Race for the Seat, completed full-time for Kaulig Racing.

==== Retirees ====
After competing full-time in the Truck Series for 25 years and winning three championships, Matt Crafton retired from full-time racing following the 2025 season. Ty Majeski, his ThorSport Racing teammate, will move from the No. 98 truck to the No. 88 truck for 2026. Crafton will return to ThorSport on a part-time basis in another one of their trucks in 2026.

=== Crew chief changes ===
Derek Smith, who was previously the crew chief of the Tricon Garage No. 5 truck driven by Toni Breidinger, will moved to CR7 Motorsports to crew chief their No. 9 truck driven by Grant Enfinger. Darren Fraley replaced Blake Bainbridge as the crew chief of the No. 81 McAnally-Hilgemann Racing truck. Fraley was crew chief for the team's part-time No. 16 truck in 2025. Dave Elenz, who was last a crew chief for Legacy Motor Club in the Cup Series in 2024 and was also an O'Reilly Auto Parts Series crew chief for JR Motorsports for several years, will be the new crew chief of the McAnally–Hilgemann Racing No. 91 truck. He replaces Joshua Graham, who left the team to crew chief for Viking Motorsports in the O'Reilly Auto Parts Series. Todd Myers will be the new crew chief of the Reaume Brothers Racing No. 2 truck. That truck had a rotation of different crew chiefs in 2025. Mike Hillman Sr. will replace his son Mike Hillman Jr. as the crew chief of the Freedom Racing Enterprises No. 76 truck. Hillman Sr. crew chiefed for Joey Gase Motorsports in the then-Xfinity Series in 2025.

== Rule changes ==
=== Policy changes ===
==== Loosening lower series restriction ====
NASCAR Cup Series drivers with three or more years of experience can participate in eight (up from five) regular season races. They are still prohibited from participating in The Chase.

=== Points system changes ===
==== Postseason format ====
Similar to the Cup Series, NASCAR changed the Chase format for the first time since the Craftsman Truck Series adapted the playoffs in 2016, the format changed on January 12, 2026. The amount of races in the Chase would remain. The win-and-you're-in, as well as the playoff point after a driver won a stage has been removed.

==== Fastest lap restriction ====
On January 16, 2026, NASCAR announced that drivers who enter the garage during a race will no longer be eligible for the "Xfinity Fastest Lap Award". However, the driver's fastest lap before they entered the garage will still stand.

==== Removal of the regular season championship ====
With the changes of the chase, the regular season championship was removed.

== Schedule ==
The schedule was released on August 20, 2025.

The Triple Truck Challenge races are listed in bold.

O Oval track
R Road course
S Street course

No	Race title	Track	Location	Date	Time (ET)	TV
1	Fresh From Florida 250	O Daytona International Speedway	Daytona Beach, Florida	February 13	7:30 pm	FS1
2	Fr8 208	O EchoPark Speedway	Hampton, Georgia	February 21	1:30 pm	FS1
3	OnlyBulls Green Flag 150	S St. Petersburg Street Circuit	St. Petersburg, Florida	February 28	12 pm	Fox
4	**Buckle Up South Carolina 200**	O Darlington Raceway	Darlington, South Carolina	March 20	7:30 pm	FS1
5	**Black's Tire 200**	O Rockingham Speedway	Rockingham, North Carolina	April 3	4:30 pm	FS1
6	**Tennessee Army National Guard 250**	O Bristol Motor Speedway	Bristol, Tennessee	April 10	7:30 pm	FS1
7	SpeedyCash.com 250	O Texas Motor Speedway	Fort Worth, Texas	May 1	8 pm	FS1
8	Bully Hill Vineyards 176 at The Glen	R Watkins Glen International	Watkins Glen, New York	May 8	4:30 pm	FS1
9	Ecosave 200	O Dover Motor Speedway	Dover, Delaware	May 15	5 pm	FS1
10	North Carolina Education Lottery 200	O Charlotte Motor Speedway	Concord, North Carolina	May 24	10 am (Note: The North Carolina Education Lottery 200 was originally scheduled on Friday, May 22 at 7:30PM, before being postponed to Saturday, May 23 at 8 am and 9 pm, before ultimately being contested on May 24 at 10 am.)	FS1
11	Allegiance 200	O Nashville Superspeedway	Lebanon, Tennessee	May 29	8 pm	FS1
12	DQS Solutions & Staffing 250	O Michigan International Speedway	Brooklyn, Michigan	June 6	1:30 pm	FS1
13	Navy 250	S Qualcomm Circuit	San Diego, California	June 19	7 pm	FS1
14	LiUNA! 150	R Lime Rock Park	Lakeville, Connecticut	July 11	1 pm	FS1
15	FaithFest 250	O North Wilkesboro Speedway	North Wilkesboro, North Carolina	July 18	12:30 pm	FS1
16	TSport 200	O Lucas Oil Indianapolis Raceway Park	Brownsburg, Indiana	July 24	8 pm	FS1
17	Black's Tire 250	O Richmond Raceway	Richmond, Virginia	August 15	12 pm (Note: The Black's Tire 250 was originally scheduled on Friday, August 14 at 7:30PM, before being postponed to Saturday, August 15 due to rain.)	FS2
18	Team EJP 175	O New Hampshire Motor Speedway	Loudon, New Hampshire	August 22	1:30 pm	FS1
The Chase
19	UNOH 250	O Bristol Motor Speedway	Bristol, Tennessee	September 17	8 pm	FS1
20	RaceToStopSuicide.com 200	O Kansas Speedway	Kansas City, Kansas	September 26	1 pm	FS1
21	Ecosave 200	O Charlotte Motor Speedway	Concord, North Carolina	October 9	5 pm	Fox
22	Zero Carbon Bioethanol 150	O Phoenix Raceway	Phoenix, Arizona	October 16	7:30 pm	FS1
23	Love's RV Stop 225	O Talladega Superspeedway	Lincoln, Alabama	October 23	4 pm	FS1
24	Black's Tire 200	O Martinsville Speedway	Martinsville, Virginia	October 30	6:30 pm	FS1
25	Craftsman 200	O Homestead–Miami Speedway	Homestead, Florida	November 6	7:30 pm	FS1

=== Schedule changes ===
The series raced at the St. Petersburg Street Circuit and the Coronado Street Course for the first time. Las Vegas Motor Speedway and Pocono Raceway were dropped from the schedule. Dover Motor Speedway returned for the first time since 2020. The Charlotte Motor Speedway fall race will move away from the roval layout to the oval, after one year as a road course race. This is one of only two tracks that will have multiple dates on the 2026 schedule, along with Bristol Motor Speedway.

== Season summary ==
=== Regular season ===
2024 series champion Ty Majeski won the pole at Daytona. The race featured the return of Tony Stewart and Ram in the sport since 2016 and 2012, respectively. Carson Hocevar won stage one, and Chandler Smith won stage two. Smith made a thrilling four-wide move in the tri-oval on the final lap to win the race.

Jake Garcia won the pole at Atlanta. Corey Heim won stage one, and Stewart Friesen won stage two. The race was shortened due to time constraints with the O'Reilly Auto Parts Series race, ending ten laps short. Kyle Busch would win the race, marking his third consecutive win for the Truck Series race at Atlanta.

Connor Mosack won the pole at St. Petersburg, the first ever Craftsman Truck Series race on a street course. Ben Rhodes won stage one, and Layne Riggs won stage two. Riggs, who dominated the later half of the event, with 41 laps led, would win the race.

Kaden Honeycutt won the pole at Darlington. Christian Eckes won stage one. Honeycutt won stage two. Carson Hocevar a Cup Series regular, crashed on lap 145, causing overtime. Ross Chastain was leading the race late, however, Corey Heim overtook him on the last corner of the last lap.

Jake Garcia won the pole at Rockingham. Corey Heim swept the stages. Heim held off teammate Kaden Honeycutt to win the race, winning back to back races in the Triple Truck Challenge, becoming the second driver to do so.

Kaden Honeycutt won the pole at Bristol. Christian Eckes won stage one, and Ben Rhodes won stage two. Christopher Bell would overcome a late race red flag with around 80 laps after the leaders crashed out, and ultimately winning his first race since 2017.

Ben Rhodes won the pole at Texas. Rhodes led every lap en route to a stage one win while holding off Carson Hocevar. Hocevar then won stage two, after passing Mini Tyrrell late. Stage three would feature a wild ending, with two huge wrecks on the frontstretch, which brought out two red flags. After the track was cleared, on the last restart for overtime, Hocevar held off Gio Ruggiero for his second career win at Texas Motor Speedway.

Brent Crews won the pole at Watkins Glen. Daniel Hemric won stage one, and Connor Zilisch dominated and ultimately won stage 2. Kaden Honeycutt would prevail to claim his first career NASCAR Craftsman Truck Series win, hours after winning the ARCA Menards Series race.

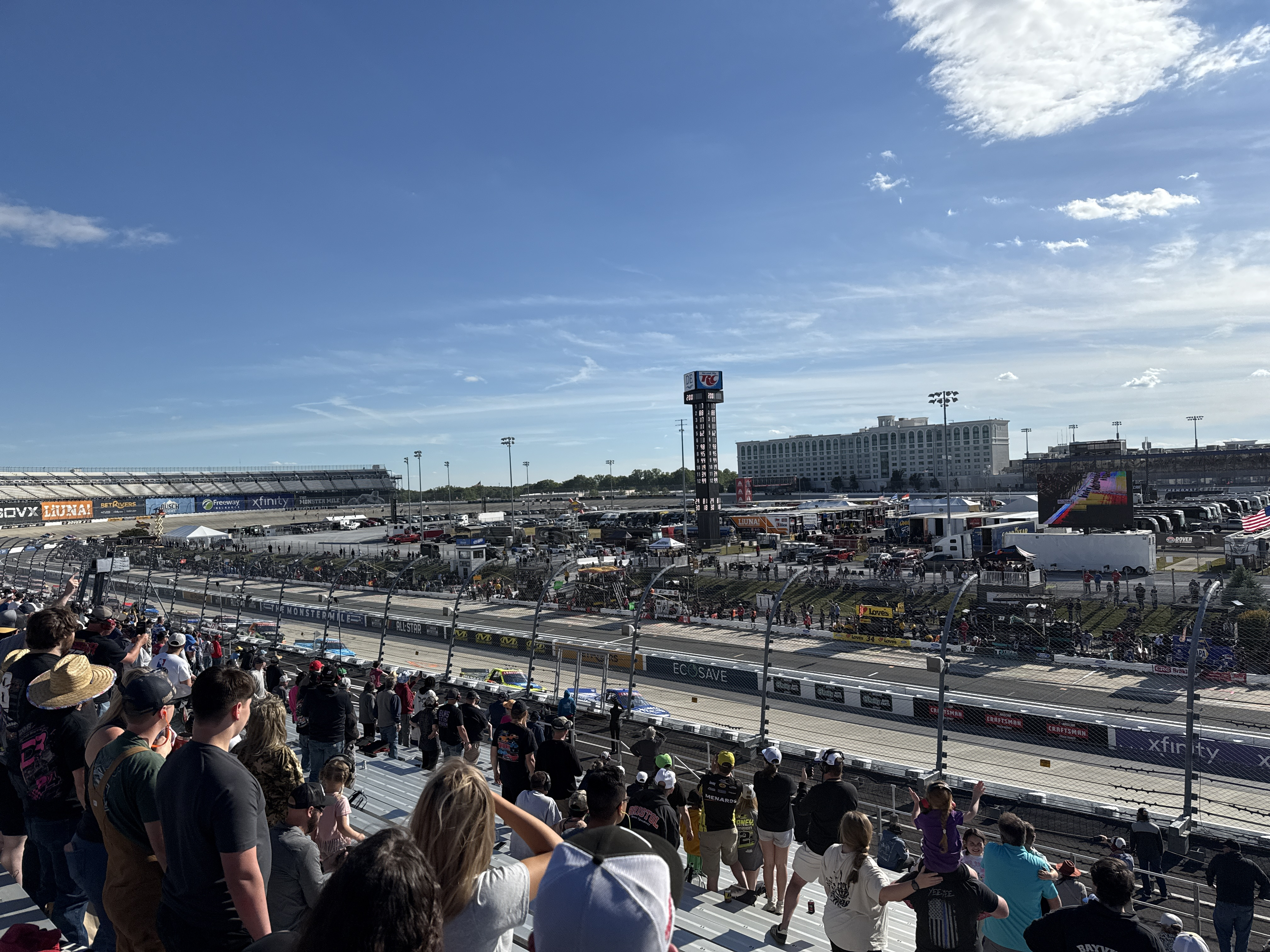
The Ecosave 200 at Dover Motor Speedway in May

Kyle Busch won the pole at Dover. Busch dominated the race, leading 147 laps, and sweeping the stages. Busch ultimately claimed his 69th and final career Craftsman Truck Series victory, as well as 13th overall at Dover Motor Speedway; it was also his final NASCAR victory, as he died unexpectedly on May 21.

Rain at Charlotte canceled qualifying, with Corey Day (as a relief driver for Kyle Busch) winning the pole. Christian Eckes won stage one after the race was postponed to the same day as the Coca-Cola 600, and Layne Riggs won stage two. The race ended early due to Fox broadcasting the Indianapolis 500, with Riggs ending up winning.

Rain at Nashville canceled qualifying, with Layne Riggs winning the pole. Riggs dominated, leading a race-high 99 laps and swept the stages. Riggs made a last lap pass on Rajah Caruth and held off teammate Chandler Smith for his second consecutive win.

Ty Majeski won the pole at Michigan. Christopher Bell swept the stages, Bell's first time sweeping the stages in the Truck Series since the 2017 Active Pest Control 200. Corey Heim held off teammate Kaden Honeycutt for the win on the last lap, Heim's third win in the season.

Kaden Honeycutt won the pole at Coronado. Layne Riggs won stage one and Parker Kligerman won stage two. Riggs won the race after battling Tyler Reif, who made a mistake in the chicane. This was the longest Truck Series race in history, with a race time of 2 hours, 48 minutes, and 13 seconds.

Layne Riggs won the pole at Lime Rock. Riggs won the first stage, while Kaden Honeycutt won the second stage. In a caution-filled final stage, Grant Enfinger took advantage of late troubles with Riggs and Honeycutt and earned his 13th career Truck Series win, snapping a winless streak dating back to the 2024 Baptist Health 200.

Layne Riggs won the pole at North Wilkesboro. Riggs won the first stage, while Ty Majeski won the second stage. Chandler Smith led the final 105 laps and won the race.

Layne Riggs won the pole at Lucas Oil IRP. Riggs dominated the race, sweeping the stages and leading all but two laps to earn his tenth career NASCAR Truck Series win, his fifth of the season, and his second consecutive win at the track.

Shane van Gisbergen won the pole at Richmond. The race was postponed from Friday to Saturday, Kaden Honeycutt dominated the race leading a race-high 225 laps and sweeping both stages to score his second career NASCAR Truck Series win, and his second of the season.

Layne Riggs won the pole at New Hampshire. Connor Zilisch swept both stages and Riggs led 106 laps and survived a double overtime restart to score his 11th career NASCAR Truck Series win, and his sixth of the season. Riggs, Kaden Honeycutt, Chandler Smith, Christian Eckes, Gio Ruggiero, Ty Majeski, Grant Enfinger, Daniel Hemric, Ben Rhodes, and Tyler Ankrum qualified into The Chase.

=== The Chase ===
Due to lighting qualifying was canceled Bristol at Layne Riggs won the pole. Riggs swept both stages and led 135 laps but had an issue on the final stage. Jake Garcia led the final 104 laps to earn his first career NASCAR Truck Series win in his 94th start.

Due to inclement weather at Kansas qualifying was canceled Nick Sanchez won the pole. Kaden Honeycutt swept both stages, and after a nearly five-hour red flag in the final stage due to constant rain showers, Honeycutt led 111 laps to earn his third career NASCAR Truck Series win and his third of the season.

Connor Mosack won the pole at Charlotte. Layne Riggs won stage one while Kaden Honeycutt won stage two, in the final seven laps, Riggs passed Honeycutt and led the remainder of the race to earn his 12th career NASCAR Truck Series win, his seventh of the season.

Layne Riggs won the pole at Phoenix. Ty Majeski swept both stages and Kaden Honeycutt earned his fourth career Truck Series win, and his fourth of the season.

Ty Majeski won the pole at Talladega. Gio Ruggiero won stage one while Tanner Gray won stage two. Sammy Smith earned his first career NASCAR Truck Series win. This was the final Truck Series race for Rackley W.A.R..

Tristan McKee won the pole at Martinsville becoming the youngest pole winner in series history at 16 years, 2 months, and 27 days old. Layne Riggs swept both stages and on the final restart his teammate Chandler Smith passed Riggs and led the final 11 laps to earn his tenth career NASCAR Truck Series win, and his third of the season. This was the final Truck Series race for Hill Motorsports.

Nick Sanchez won the pole at Homestead. Corey Heim swept both stages and Kaden Honeycutt taking the lead from Christian Eckes with 13 laps to go, and led the remaining laps to earn his fifth career NASCAR Truck Series win, and his fifth of the season, clinching his first Truck Series championship while Layne Riggs finished 2nd in points.

== Results and standings ==
=== Race results ===
No.	Race	Pole position	Most laps led	Fastest race lap	Winning driver	Manufacturer	No.	Winning team	Report
1	Fresh From Florida 250	Ty Majeski	Carson Hocevar; Justin Haley; Michael McDowell (Note: Hocevar, Haley, and McDowell all led 20 laps.)	Daniel Hemric	Chandler Smith	Ford	38	Front Row Motorsports	Report
2	Fr8 208	Jake Garcia	Ben Rhodes	Tanner Gray	Kyle Busch	Chevrolet	7	Spire Motorsports	Report
3	OnlyBulls Green Flag 150	Connor Mosack	Layne Riggs	Layne Riggs	Layne Riggs	Ford	34	Front Row Motorsports	Report
4	Buckle Up South Carolina 200	Kaden Honeycutt	Kaden Honeycutt	Carson Hocevar	Corey Heim	Toyota	5	Tricon Garage	Report
5	Black's Tire 200	Jake Garcia	Corey Heim	Corey Heim	Corey Heim	Toyota	1	Tricon Garage	Report
6	Tennessee Army National Guard 250	Kaden Honeycutt	Christian Eckes	Christian Eckes	Christopher Bell	Toyota	62	Halmar Friesen Racing	Report
7	SpeedyCash.com 250	Ben Rhodes	Carson Hocevar	Jake Garcia	Carson Hocevar	Chevrolet	77	Spire Motorsports	Report
8	Bully Hill Vineyards 176 at The Glen	Brent Crews	Connor Zilisch	Brent Crews	Kaden Honeycutt	Toyota	11	Tricon Garage	Report
9	Ecosave 200	Kyle Busch	Kyle Busch	Kyle Busch	Kyle Busch	Chevrolet	7	Spire Motorsports	Report
10	North Carolina Education Lottery 200	Corey Day	Layne Riggs	Chandler Smith	Layne Riggs	Ford	34	Front Row Motorsports	Report
11	Allegiance 200	Layne Riggs	Layne Riggs	Layne Riggs	Layne Riggs	Ford	34	Front Row Motorsports	Report
12	DQS Solutions & Staffing 250	Ty Majeski	Carson Hocevar	Corey Heim	Corey Heim	Toyota	1	Tricon Garage	Report
13	Navy 250	Kaden Honeycutt	Layne Riggs	Chandler Smith	Layne Riggs	Ford	34	Front Row Motorsports	Report
14	LiUNA! 150	Layne Riggs	Layne Riggs	Kaden Honeycutt	Grant Enfinger	Chevrolet	9	CR7 Motorsports	Report
15	FaithFest 250	Layne Riggs	Chandler Smith	Chandler Smith	Chandler Smith	Ford	38	Front Row Motorsports	Report
16	TSport 200	Layne Riggs	Layne Riggs	Layne Riggs	Layne Riggs	Ford	34	Front Row Motorsports	Report
17	Black's Tire 250	Shane van Gisbergen	Kaden Honeycutt	Kaden Honeycutt	Kaden Honeycutt	Toyota	11	Tricon Garage	Report
18	Team EJP 175	Layne Riggs	Layne Riggs	Connor Zilisch	Layne Riggs	Ford	34	Front Row Motorsports	Report
NASCAR Craftsman Truck Series Chase
19	UNOH 250	Layne Riggs	Layne Riggs	Chandler Smith	Jake Garcia	Ford	98	ThorSport Racing	Report
20	RaceToStopSuicide.com 200	Nick Sanchez	Kaden Honeycutt	Tyler Ankrum	Kaden Honeycutt	Toyota	11	Tricon Garage	Report
21	Ecosave 200	Connor Mosack	Kaden Honeycutt	Kaden Honeycutt	Layne Riggs	Ford	34	Front Row Motorsports	Report
22	Zero Carbon Bioethanol 150	Layne Riggs	Kaden Honeycutt	Kaden Honeycutt	Kaden Honeycutt	Toyota	11	Tricon Garage	Report
23	Love's RV Stop 225	Ty Majeski	Sammy Smith	Dawson Sutton	Sammy Smith	Chevrolet	7	Spire Motorsports	Report
24	Black's Tire 200	Tristan McKee	Layne Riggs	Layne Riggs	Chandler Smith	Ford	38	Front Row Motorsports	Report
25	Craftsman 200	Nick Sanchez	Christian Eckes	Nick Sanchez	Kaden Honeycutt	Toyota	11	Tricon Garage	Report

=== Drivers' championship ===
(key) Bold – Pole position awarded by time. Italics – Pole position set by final practice results or owner's points. * – Most laps led. ^{1} – Stage 1 winner. ^{2} – Stage 2 winner

Pos.	Driver	DAY	ATL	STP	DAR	ROC	BRI	TEX	GLN	DOV	CLT	NSH	MCH	COR	LRP	NWS	IRP	RCH	NHA	BRI	KAN	CLT	PHO	TAL	MAR	HOM	Pts.	Stage
1	Kaden Honeycutt	8	21	5	**4***^{2}	2	**31**	3	1	4	2	27	2	**23**	3^{2F}	11	7	1*^{12F}	3	8	1*^{12}	3*^{2F}	1*^{F}	5	14	1	2471	297
2	Layne Riggs	31	27	1*^{2F}	12	3	22	6	21	3	1*^{2}	1*^{12F}	4	1*^{1}	**23***^{1}	**2**^{1}	**1***^{12F}	15	**1***	32*^{12}	19	1^{1}	**3**	8	3*^{12F}	32	2388	325
3	Chandler Smith	1^{2}	6	4	17	36	2	10	5	12	30^{F}	3	5	22^{F}	30	1*	4	7	2	24^{F}	6	5	15	14	1	7	2340	204
4	Ty Majeski	**4**	28	2	31	8	23	9	24	2	33	12	**35**	5	32	10^{2}	3	19	11	9	29	11	4^{12}	**4**	4	4	2319	197
5	Christian Eckes	3	36	15	3^{1}	13	5*^{1F}	8	16	7	6^{1}	8	32	9	5	4	33	3	28	30	2	2	2	21	10	2*	2308	174
6	Gio Ruggiero	2	3	25	8	17	3	14	15	20	5	9	12	10	20	6	13	9	26	6	13	26	8	25^{1}	8	11	2252	125
7	Daniel Hemric	26^{F}	34	8	9	24	12	7	4^{1}	30	11	15	13	2	6	20	34	10	8	12	4	6	7	35	15	3	2249	84
8	Ben Rhodes	12	4*	3^{1}	36	18	11^{2}	**5**^{1}	32	19	4	28	21	8	31	14	15	18	18	11	5	21	21	17	2	13	2241	121
9	Grant Enfinger	29	22	22	7	5	27	32	33	15	16	7	11	29	1	25	14	5	13	10	31	12	9	24	11	9	2210	146
10	Tyler Ankrum	9	14	31	24	6	13	15	17	25	20	5	10	31	25	19	9	11	16	13	25^{F}	9	13	2	7	34	2196	58
NASCAR Craftsman Truck Series Chase cut-off
Pos.	Driver	DAY	ATL	STP	DAR	ROC	BRI	TEX	GLN	DOV	CLT	NSH	MCH	COR	LRP	NWS	IRP	RCH	NHA	BRI	KAN	CLT	PHO	TAL	MAR	HOM	Pts.	Stage
11	Jake Garcia	32	**7**	18	23	**9**	6	29^{F}	11	9	13	32	9	32	22	13	21	6	14	1	9	29	5	26	13	8	614	66
12	Stewart Friesen	10	20^{2}	26	25	4	16	19	18	11	26	6	22	33	9	8	6	36	4	3	21	35	19	30	30	5	536	52
13	Brenden Queen **(R)**	7	16	24	20	27	10	13	9	13	32	19	14	7	12	21	20	20	20	21	14	13	23	7	12	20	514	3
14	Tanner Gray	23	30^{F}	20	13	16	20	28	30	16	8	33	18	12	8	18	22	13	21	16	8	19	28	11^{2}	18	27	510	60
15	Justin Haley	22*	10	12	15	12	15	27	23	10	17	31	28	6	14	26	18	27	9	4	11	10	20	20	34	19	496	11
16	Andrés Pérez de Lara	13	15	7	32	32	17	30	13	28	19	14	19	21	7	23	11	23	27	17	24	8	12	31	6	33	487	44
17	Corey Heim		5^{1}		1	1*^{12F}	30						1^{F}			9		2						10		6^{12}	431	104
18	Cole Butcher **(R)**	14	31	14	28	10	28	35	35	33	27	16	33	15	11	22	23	22	17	28	12	18	18	29	22	22	378	16
19	Landen Lewis			6		14								4	2	5	35	14	32	14	34	7	16	6	19	14	375	42
20	Dawson Sutton	27	32	33	19	15	7	16	19	23	21	17	36	26	15	16	17	26	25	15		14	22	19^{F}			366	12
21	Corey LaJoie	34^{†}			21^{†}	7	29	25	12	8	12	22	29	35	28	29	24	21	15	18	10	16	17	33	20	10	363	6
22	Mini Tyrrell **(R)**	19	19	28	34	25	19	21	8	27	34	20	20	11	24	28	27	29	23	26	18	15	29	28	17	23	359	6
23	Connor Mosack			13	5				10				8	24	18		2		30	25		**33**	11			16	290	39
24	Kris Wright	25	18	19	33	19	25	31	29	17	31	23	31	13	17	30	31	31	34	27	36	25	26	32	21	24	277	–
25	Frankie Muniz	16	25	30	18	31	35	23		24	24	24	23	20	26	32	29	30	QL^{¿}	33			33	12	25	28	236	–
26	Spencer Boyd	21	26		30	28	24	20		22	25	26	34				28	34	36		20	24		9	23	30	206	–
27	Tristan McKee																	8	6	5			14		**5**		177	30
28	Timmy Hill	DNQ		32	14	30	33		27		18					DNQ	19	33	29	22		32		16	31	17	165	–
29	Tyler Reif		17	16			34		14			36		19		12							27	QL^{¡}	27	21	155	8
30	Daniel Dye	17	13	17								10	15								15	28					150	6
31	Parker Kligerman							11					16	18^{2}	4											15	135	14
32	Parker Eatmon					26				21							12	16	10	31	22						125	4
33	Nick Leitz	11														17		12		34	7						118	14
34	Josh Reaume	20	24		35			22			28		30		27						33	27		22	26		113	–
35	Clayton Green		23		29	29	36	26				29				31					23	36	35			31	79	–
36	Adam Andretti		12	23		35			25					14													76	–
37	Bayley Currey																			2		4					75	7
38	Connor Hall					20												28	22	29	32					18	73	–
39	Luke Baldwin					21	32			32	36					33			31	19		22					70	–
40	Mike Christopher Jr.					23											10		12								69	3
41	Colin Braun			9											10				24								68	–
42	Conner Jones				16			33			14											34		27	36		62	–
43	Nick Sanchez																5			20	28					**35**^{F}	60	24
44	Leland Honeyman										23							17			30	30	34			29	59	–
45	Toni Breidinger	DNQ						18	DNQ	26		DNQ					25		QL^{¶}		26		31				59	–
46	Caleb Costner		33		27	33	Wth	24		35	DNQ	25	27					DNQ			35						57	–
47	Jackson Lee			29					26					27	13								36				54	–
48	Gavan Boschele																8		33						24		50	1
49	Ben Maier			11											33								25				42	–
50	Clay Greenfield	18																						15			41	–
51	Conor Daly																26				16		30				39	–
52	Travis Pastrana	15									22																38	–
53	Mason Massey																	25	DNQ							12	37	–
54	Kaz Grala													3													34	–
55	Regan Smith																			23		17					34	–
56	Nathan Nicholson			34					20					28		34											32	–
57	Derek Lemke											21						24									29	–
58	Jason White	33																						13			28	–
59	Thomas Annunziata														29									23			28	6
60	James Hinchcliffe			10																							27	–
61	Carson Ferguson						21					35													29		26	–
62	Wesley Slimp			36					34						16												25	–
63	Stephen Mallozzi								22												27						25	–
64	Spencer Davis												24													26	24	–
65	Kasey Kleyn															35		DNQ							16		23	–
66	Cory Roper							34																18			22	–
67	Brendan Gaughan													16													21	–
68	Austin Varco													17													20	–
69	Stefan Parsons											18															19	–
70	Graham Doyle														19												18	–
71	Justin Carroll	DNQ	35		26	DNQ	Wth						Wth				DNQ	DNQ		DNQ					32		18	–
72	Dario Franchitti			27																							18	8
73	Carter Fartuch			21																							16	–
74	Louis Foster														21												16	–
75	Matt Mills																					23					14	–
76	Donovan Strauss															36							24				14	–
77	Monty Tipton																30						32		35		14	–
78	Ryan Newman															24											13	–
79	Justin Marks													25													12	–
80	Matt Crafton																									25	12	–
81	Morgen Baird												26														11	–
82	Clint Bowyer									29																	8	–
83	Jason Kitzmiller	30																									7	–
84	Cassten Everidge																32										5	–
85	Elliott Sadler																	32									5	–
86	Natalie Decker								36	34																	4	–
87	Tony Stewart	36																						34			4	–
88	Jamie McMurray													34													3	–
89	Dystany Spurlock								DNQ	36								35									3	–
90	Derek White			35															DNQ								2	–
91	Patrick Emerling																		35								2	–
92	Caden Kvapil																			35							2	–
93	Jackson Macenko																36			36							2	–
	Greg Van Alst	DNQ			Wth																							–
	Norm Benning	DNQ																						DNQ				–
	Bryan Dauzat	DNQ																						DNQ				–
	Landon Huffman															DNQ												–
	D. L. Wilson																		DNQ									–
	Jonathan Shafer					DNQ						DNQ					DNQ										-25	–
Ineligible for Craftsman Truck Series driver points
Pos	Driver	DAY	ATL	STP	DAR	ROC	BRI	TEX	GLN	DOV	CLT	NSH	MCH	COR	LRP	NWS	IRP	RCH	NHA	BRI	KAN	CLT	PHO	TAL	MAR	HOM	Pts.	Stage
	Kyle Busch (Note: After Busch's death, NASCAR initially removed him from their points standings. However, his name was added back following the Craftsman 200.)		1				8	2		**1***^{12F}	Wth																	
	Carson Hocevar	35*^{1}	2		22^{F}	34	9	1*^{2}	31	31			3*			27												
	Christopher Bell				6		1			5			6^{12}			15		QL^{‡}	7									
	Sammy Smith					11																		1*	33			
	Connor Zilisch								2*^{2}		3								5^{12F}									
	Ross Chastain				2		4	12	28	18	29	4	17															
	Rajah Caruth											2										31						
	Shane van Gisbergen								3		15					3		**4**										
	Brent Crews								**7**^{F}												3	20	10					
	Austin Green																							3				
	Brandon Jones							4		6	7	13																
	John Hunter Nemechek	5	8																19									
	Ricky Stenhouse Jr.	6	9				26				9		7															
	William Sawalich				10			17		14	10	30								7			6		9			
	A. J. Allmendinger				11				6																			
	Chase Elliott															7												
	Ty Dillon		11			22																						
	Parker Retzlaff											11																
	Chase Briscoe						14																					
	Harrison Burton																16											
	Brennan Poole																				17							
	Daniel Suárez						18																					
	Michael McDowell	24*																										
	Garrett Mitchell	37											25											36				
	Taylor Gray	28																										
	Tyler Tomassi	DNQ	29																						28			
	Jimmie Johnson													30														
	Jesse Love											34																
	Corey Day										35																	
Pos	Driver	DAY	ATL	STP	DAR	ROC	BRI	TEX	GLN	DOV	CLT	NSH	MCH	COR	LRP	NWS	IRP	RCH	NHA	BRI	KAN	CLT	PHO	TAL	MAR	HOM	Pts.	Stage
^{†} – Corey LaJoie started receiving points at Rockingham.^{‡} – Qualified but replaced by Leland Honeyman.^{¶} – Qualified but replaced by Dawson Sutton^{¿} – Qualified but replaced by Luke Baldwin^{¡} – Qualified for Conner Jones

=== Owners' championship (Top 15) ===
(key) Bold – Pole position awarded by time. Italics – Pole position set by final practice results or owner's points. * – Most laps led. ^{1} – Stage 1 winner. ^{2} – Stage 2 winner

Pos.	No.	Truck Owner	DAY	ATL	STP	DAR	ROC	BRI	TEX	GLN	DOV	CLT	NSH	MCH	COR	LRP	NWS	IRP	RCH	NHA	BRI	KAN	CLT	PHO	TAL	MAR	HOM	Points
1	11	David Gilliland	8	21	5	**4***^{2}	2	**31**	3	1	4	2	27	2	23	3^{2F}	11	7	1*^{12F}	3	8	1*^{12}	3*^{2F}	1*^{F}	5	14	1	2471
2	34	Bob Jenkins	31	27	1*^{2F}	12	3	22	6	24	3	1*^{2}	1*^{12F}	4	1*^{1}	**23***^{1}	**2**^{1}	**1***^{12F}	15	**1***	32*^{12}	19	1^{1}	**3**	8	3*^{12F}	32	2388
3	38	Bob Jenkins	1^{2}	6	4	17	36	2	10	5	12	30^{F}	3	5	22^{F}	30	1*^{F}	4	7	2	24^{F}	6	5	15	14	1	7	2340
4	88	Rhonda Thorson	**4**	28	2	31	8	23	9	16	2	33	12	**35**	5	32	10^{2}	3	19	11	9	29	11	4^{12}	**4**	4	4	2299
5	91	William Hilgemann	3	36	15	3^{1}	13	5*^{1F}	8	18	7	6^{1}	8	32	9	5	4	33	3	28	30	2	2	2	21	10	2*	2298
6	77	Jeff Dickerson	35*^{1}	2	10	22^{F}	34	9	1*^{2}	31	31	3	34	3*	25	4	27	5	8	6	5	28	31	14	3	**5**	**35**^{F}	2256
7	17	David Gilliland	2	3	25	8	17	3	14	17	20	5	9	12	10	20	6	13	9	26	6	13	26	8	25^{1}	8	11	2242
8	1	Kevin Ray	28	5^{1}	27	10	1*^{12F}	30	4	**7**^{F}	6	7	13	1^{F}	30	29	17	8	12	33	34	7	20	10	10	24	6^{12}	2241
9	7	Jeff Dickerson	24*	1	13	5	11	8	2	11	**1***^{12F}	35	2	8	24	18	7	2	**4**	30	25	17	**33**	11	1*	33	16	2210
10	45	Greg Fowler	6	9	6	2	14	4	12	28	18	29	4	17	4	2	5	35	14	32	14	34	7	16	6	19	14	2199
NASCAR Craftsman Truck Series Chase cut-off
11	19	Bill McAnally	26^{F}	34	8	9	24	12	7	4^{1}	30	11	15	13	2	6	20	34	10	8	12	4	6	7	35	15	3	659
12	99	Duke Thorson	12	4*	3^{1}	36	18	11^{2}	**5**^{1}	32	19	4	28	21	8	31	14	15	18	18	11	5	21	21	17	2	13	652
13	9	Larry Berg	29	22	22	7	5	27	32	33	15	16	7	11	29	1	25	14	5	13	10	31	12	9	24	11	9	631
14	5	Johnny Gray	11	12	23	1	35	14	17	25	17	10	30	24	14	19	9	16	2	19	2	3	5	6	23	9	26	624
15	98	Mike Curb	32	**7**	18	23	**9**	6	29^{F}	11	9	13	32	9	32	22	13	21	6	14	1	9	29	5	26	13	8	614
Pos.	No.	Truck Owner	DAY	ATL	STP	DAR	ROC	BRI	TEX	GLN	DOV	CLT	NSH	MCH	COR	LRP	NWS	IRP	RCH	NHA	BRI	KAN	CLT	PHO	TAL	MAR	HOM	Points

=== Manufacturers' championship ===
Pos	Manufacturer	Wins	Points
1	Ford	11	1053
2	Toyota	9	1023
3	Chevrolet	5	952
4	Ram	0	647

== See also ==
- 2026 NASCAR Cup Series
- 2026 NASCAR O'Reilly Auto Parts Series
- 2026 ARCA Menards Series
- 2026 ARCA Menards Series East
- 2026 ARCA Menards Series West
- 2026 NASCAR Whelen Modified Tour
- 2026 NASCAR Euro Series
- 2026 NASCAR Canada Series
- 2026 NASCAR Brasil Series
