= Connor Hall (racing driver) =

American racing driver (born 1997)

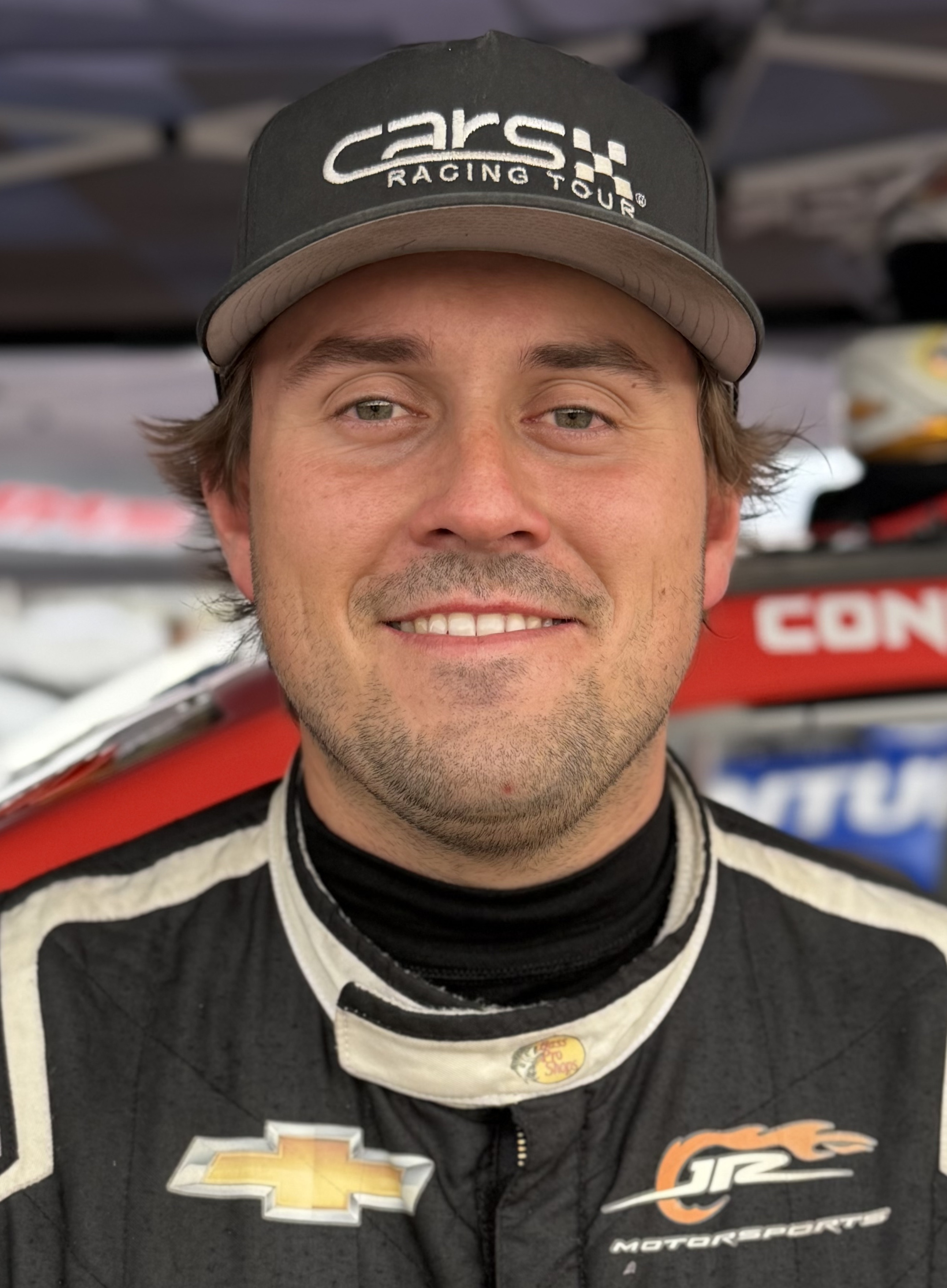
- Hall at Las Vegas Motor Speedway in 2025
- Born: Connor Greene Hall; February 17, 1997 (age 29); Hampton, Virginia, U.S.
- Achievements: 2023, 2024 NASCAR Advance Auto Parts Weekly Series Champion; 2019 Hampton Heat Winner; 2022 Throwback 276 Winner (LMSC); 2024 Thunder Road 200 Winner; 2024 Fall Brawl Winner (LMSC)

NASCAR FedEx Freight Truck Series career
- 7 races run over 2 years
- 2026 position: 38th
- Best finish: 38th (2026)
- First race: 2024 Clean Harbors 250 (Richmond)
- Last race: 2026 Craftsman 200 (Homestead)
Wins	Top tens	Poles
0	1	0

ARCA Menards Series career
- 3 races run over 2 years
- Best finish: 55th (2019)
- First race: 2019 Lucas Oil 200 (Daytona)
- Last race: 2020 Lucas Oil 200 (Daytona)
Wins	Top tens	Poles
0	0	0

ARCA Menards Series East career
- 6 races run over 3 years
- Best finish: 25th (2018)
- First race: 2018 Visit Hampton VA 150 (Langley)
- Last race: 2026 Rockingham ARCA Menards Series East 125 (Rockingham)
Wins	Top tens	Poles
0	2	0

ARCA Menards Series West career
- 2 races run over 1 year
- Best finish: 16th (2025)
- First race: 2025 Star Nursery 150 (Las Vegas Bullring)
- Last race: 2025 Desert Diamond Casino West Valley 100 (Phoenix)
Wins	Top tens	Poles
0	2	0
- Statistics up to date as of November 6, 2026.

Connor Greene Hall (born February 17, 1997) is an American professional stock car racing driver. He last competed part-time in the NASCAR Craftsman Truck Series, driving the No. 4 Chevrolet Silverado RST for Niece Motorsports, and part-time in the ARCA Menards Series East, driving the No. 24 Chevrolet for SPS Racing. He has previously competed in the NASCAR Craftsman Truck Series, ARCA Menards Series, and the ARCA Menards Series West. Hall is the 2023 and 2024 NASCAR Advance Auto Parts Weekly Series National champion.

== Racing career ==
Hall drove in three races for Marsh Racing in the NASCAR K&N Pro Series East in 2018. Driving their No. 31 Chevrolet, he earned a top-ten finish in his series debut at Langley. He then competed in the doubleheader races at South Boston, but crashed out in both. He finished eleventh in the first race and thirteenth in the second one.

Hall made his debut in the ARCA Menards Series in 2019 at their season-opener at Daytona, driving Chad Bryant Racing's No. 22 car. It was his only scheduled start of the year, as the primary driver of that car for the season, Corey Heim, was only sixteen years old and ineligible to race at the track. It was also announced at that time that he would be returning to Marsh's No. 31 in the East Series for the New Smyrna season-opener in that series. Hall did end up running one more race later in the season, which came at Michigan when Bryant's team fielded a third car, the No. 7, for him. Hall finished in sixteenth due to vibrations in the car.

For the 2020 ARCA season, Hall returned to CBR and drove the No. 22 for the second year in a row at Daytona. He had driven for the team along with teammates Jacob Heafner (in the No. 77) and Tom Hessert (in the No. 2) at the series' preseason testing at Daytona the prior month. With CBR's plans and driver lineup not set prior to the start of the season (their full-time driver Joe Graf Jr. moved to the Xfinity Series with SS-Green Light Racing and Heim left for Venturini Motorsports), Hall was entered in the Lucas Oil 200 Driven by General Tire at Daytona International Speedway, however, he would not race for the team in any other races that season.

In 2022, Hall competed in the CARS Tour in a reunion with CBR. He finished second in the standings but won a race at Jacksonville Speedway.

Hall intended to run the series full-time again in 2023 in the No. 77 CBR entry, but due to his success in the NASCAR Advance Auto Parts Weekly Series, he ran only a partial schedule. He ultimately was named the national champion of the NASCAR series.

In 2024, Hall returned full-time to the CARS Tour with the No. 22 Nelson Motorsports entry. He replaced Landon Huffman, who ran part-time for the team in 2023. Hall won his first tour race with Nelson Motorsports at Langley Speedway by .007 seconds in a three-wide photo finish. Hall also had success in other late model races in 2024, winning the first leg of the Virginia Triple Crown at the Tunder Road 200 held at South Boston Speedway and finishing second at the Hampton Heat Race at Langley Speedway. He had previously won the Hampton Heat Race in 2019.

On July 31, 2024, it was announced that Hall would make his debut in the NASCAR Craftsman Truck Series in the race at his home track of Richmond Raceway driving the No. 91 truck for McAnally–Hilgemann Racing.

== Personal life ==
Hall is from Hampton, Virginia, where he was born to Earle and Denise Hall. He has a sister named Kelsey. His father was a Hydroplane racer, where he won several world and national titles. Later, Earle became a partner in Bluewater Yacht Sales, where Connor worked as a sales professional.

== Motorsports career results ==
=== Stock car career summary ===
Season	Series	Team	Races	Wins	Top 5	Top 10	Points	Position
2018	NASCAR K&N Pro Series East	Marsh Racing	3	0	0	1	101	25th
2019	NASCAR K&N Pro Series East	Marsh Racing	1	0	0	1	34	35th
2019	ARCA Menards Series	Chad Bryant Racing	2	0	0	0	325	55th
2020	ARCA Menards Series	Chad Bryant Racing	1	0	0	0	24	83rd
2021	CARS Late Model Stock Car Tour	Earle Hall	1	0	1	1	32	33rd
2022	CARS Late Model Stock Car Tour	Earle Hall	15	3	8	10	385	**2nd**
2023	CARS Late Model Stock Car Tour	Earle Hall	12	1	6	6	281	12th
2024	CARS Late Model Stock Car Tour	Nelson Motorsports	17	1	11	12	457	**2nd**
2024	NASCAR Craftsman Truck Series	McAnally-Hilgemann Racing	1	0	0	1	27	49th
2025	CARS Late Model Stock Car Tour	JR Motorsports	15	2	8	10	536	**2nd**
2026	SMART Modified Tour	Sadler-Stanley Racing	1	0	0	1	32	49th
2026	CARS Late Model Stock Car Tour	Nelson Motorsports	2	1	1	1	143	28th
2026	CARS Late Model Stock Car Tour	Niece Motorsports	2	0	2	2	143	28th
2026	ARCA Menards Series East	SPS Racing	2	0	0	0	56	41st
2026	NASCAR Craftsman Truck Series	Niece Motorsports	6	0	0	0	78	38th

=== NASCAR ===
(key) (Bold – Pole position awarded by qualifying time. Italics – Pole position earned by points standings or practice time. * – Most laps led.)

==== Craftsman Truck Series ====
NASCAR Craftsman Truck Series results
Year	Team	No.	Make	1	2	3	4	5	6	7	8	9	10	11	12	13	14	15	16	17	18	19	20	21	22	23	24	25	NCTC	Pts	Ref
2024	McAnally–Hilgemann Racing	91	Chevy	DAY	ATL	LVS	BRI	COA	MAR	TEX	KAN	DAR	NWS	CLT	GTW	NSH	POC	IRP	RCH; 10	MLW	BRI	KAN	TAL	HOM	MAR	PHO			49th	27	
2026	Niece Motorsports	4	Chevy	DAY	ATL	STP	DAR	CAR; 20	BRI	TEX	GLN	DOV	CLT	NSH	MCH	COR	LRP	NWS	IRP	RCH; 28	NHA; 22	BRI; 29	KAN; 32	CLT	PHO	TAL	MAR	HOM; 18	38th	73	

^{*} Season still in progress
^{1} Ineligible for series points

=== ARCA Menards Series ===
(key) (Bold – Pole position awarded by qualifying time. Italics – Pole position earned by points standings or practice time. * – Most laps led.)

ARCA Menards Series results
Year	Team	No.	Make	1	2	3	4	5	6	7	8	9	10	11	12	13	14	15	16	17	18	19	20	AMSC	Pts	Ref
2019	Chad Bryant Racing	22	Ford	DAY; 11	FIF	SLM	TAL	NSH	TOL	CLT	POC													55th	325	
2019	Chad Bryant Racing	7	Chevy									MCH; 16	MAD	GTW	CHI	ELK	IOW	POC	ISF	DSF	SLM	IRP	KAN	55th	325	
2020	Chad Bryant Racing	22	Ford	DAY; 20	PHO	TAL	POC	IRP	KEN	IOW	KAN	TOL	TOL	MCH	DRC	GTW	L44	TOL	BRI	WIN	MEM	ISF	KAN	83rd	24	

==== ARCA Menards Series East ====
ARCA Menards Series East results
Year	Team	No.	Make	1	2	3	4	5	6	7	8	9	10	11	12	13	14	AMSEC	Pts	Ref
2018	Marsh Racing	31	Chevy	NSM	BRI	LGY; 7	SBO; 11	SBO; 13	MEM	NJM	TMP	NHA	IOW	GLN	GTW	NHA	DOV	25th	101	
2019	Marsh Racing	31	Chevy	NSM; 10	BRI	SBO	SBO	MEM	NHA	IOW	GLN	BRI	GTW	NHA	DOV			35th	34	
2026	SPS Racing	24	Chevy	HCY; 15	CAR; 17	NSV	TOL	IRP	FRS	IOW	BRI							41st	56	

==== ARCA Menards Series West ====
ARCA Menards Series West results
Year	Team	No.	Make	1	2	3	4	5	6	7	8	9	10	11	12	AMSWC	Pts	Ref
2025	Sigma Performance Services	24	Chevy	KER	PHO	TUC	CNS	KER	SON	TRI	PIR	AAS	MAD	LVS; 2	PHO; 7	16th	130	

=== CARS Late Model Stock Car Tour ===
(key) (Bold – Pole position awarded by qualifying time. Italics – Pole position earned by points standings or practice time. * – Most laps led. ** – All laps led.)

CARS Late Model Stock Car Tour results
Year	Team	No.	Make	1	2	3	4	5	6	7	8	9	10	11	12	13	14	15	16	17	CLMSCTC	Pts	Ref
2021	Earle Hall	77	Toyota	DIL	HCY	OCS	ACE	CRW	LGY	DOM	HCY	MMS	TCM	FLC	WKS	**SBO**; 3					33rd	32	
2022	Earle Hall	77	Chevy	**CRW**; 14	HCY; 15	GPS; 24	**AAS**; 1*	FCS; 4*	LGY; 6	DOM; 1		ACE; 9	MMS; 5	NWS; 16	TCM; 21*	ACE; 3	SBO; 4	CRW; 2			2nd	385	
2022	Earle Hall	99	Chevy								**HCY**; 1										2nd	385	
2023	Earle Hall	77	Chevy	SNM; 4	FLC; 13	HCY; 2	ACE; 3	NWS; 4	LGY; 1	DOM; 5	CRW; 13*		ACE; 25	TCM	WKS	AAS	SBO	TCM; 18	CRW; 13		12th	281	
2023	Earle Hall	4	Chevy									HCY; 18									12th	281	
2024	Nelson Motorsports	22	Toyota	SNM; 2	HCY; 4	AAS; 3	OCS; 4	ACE; 12	TCM; 19	LGY; 1	DOM; 2	CRW; 3		NWS; 18	ACE; 5	WCS; 11	**FLC**; 4	SBO; 7	TCM; 13	NWS; 4	2nd	457	
2024	Nelson Motorsports	17	Toyota										**HCY**; 3								2nd	457	
2025	JR Motorsports	88	Chevy	**AAS**; 1*	WCS; 2	CDL; 1	OCS; 18	ACE; 11	NWS; 10	LGY; 7	DOM; 2	CRW; 12	HCY; 14	AND; 5	FLC; 2	SBO; 18	TCM; 3	NWS; 4			2nd	536	
2026	Nelson Motorsports	12	Chevy	SNM	WCS	NSV	CRW	ACE	LGY; 1*	DOM; 25											28th	143	
2026	Niece Motorsports	4H	Chevy								NWS; 4	HCY	AND	FLC	TCM	NPS	**SBO**; 3				28th	143	

=== SMART Modified Tour ===
SMART Modified Tour results
Year	Car owner	No.	Make	1	2	3	4	5	6	7	8	9	10	11	12	13	SMTC	Pts	Ref
2026	Sadler-Stanley Racing	16VA	N/A	FLO	AND; 9	SBO	DOM	HCY; DNS	WKS	FCR	CRW	PUL	CAR	ROU	TRI	NWS	49th	32	
