= 2024 Buckle Up South Carolina 200 =

9th race of the 2024 NASCAR Craftsman Truck Series

Race details
- Race 9 of 23 of the 2024 NASCAR Craftsman Truck Series
- Date: May 10–11, 2024
- Official name: 5th Annual Buckle Up South Carolina 200
- Location: Darlington Raceway in Darlington, South Carolina
- Course: Permanent racing facility
- Course length: 1.366 miles (2.198 km)
- Distance: 150 laps, 205 mi (330 km)
- Scheduled distance: 147 laps, 200 mi (323 km)
- Average speed: 101.983 mph (164.126 km/h)

Pole position
Driver	Nick Sanchez	Rev Racing
- Time: 29.288

Most laps led
Driver	Corey Heim	Tricon Garage
- Laps: 77

Winner
No. 45	Ross Chastain	Niece Motorsports

Television in the United States
- Network: FS1
- Announcers: Jamie Little, Phil Parsons, and Michael Waltrip

Radio in the United States
- Radio: MRN

The 2024 Buckle Up South Carolina 200 was the 9th stock car race of the 2024 NASCAR Craftsman Truck Series, and the 5th iteration of the event. The majority of the race was held on Friday, May 10, 2024, and would end shortly after midnight on Saturday, May 11, due to constant rain showers that delayed the start. The race was held in Darlington, South Carolina at Darlington Raceway, a 1.366 miles (2.198 km) permanent asphalt egg-shaped speedway. The race was originally scheduled to be contested over 147 laps, but was increased to 150 laps due to a NASCAR overtime finish. In a wild and action packed race, Ross Chastain, driving for Niece Motorsports, would steal the win after taking the lead on the final restart, and held off a fast charging field to earn his fifth career NASCAR Craftsman Truck Series win, and his first of the season. Corey Heim, who started second, was the most dominant driver of the race, winning both stages and leading a race-high 77 laps, but finished 28th after being involved in a late race incident. To fill out the podium, Nick Sanchez, driving for Rev Racing, and Ben Rhodes, driving for ThorSport Racing, would finish 2nd and 3rd, respectively.

== Report ==
=== Background ===
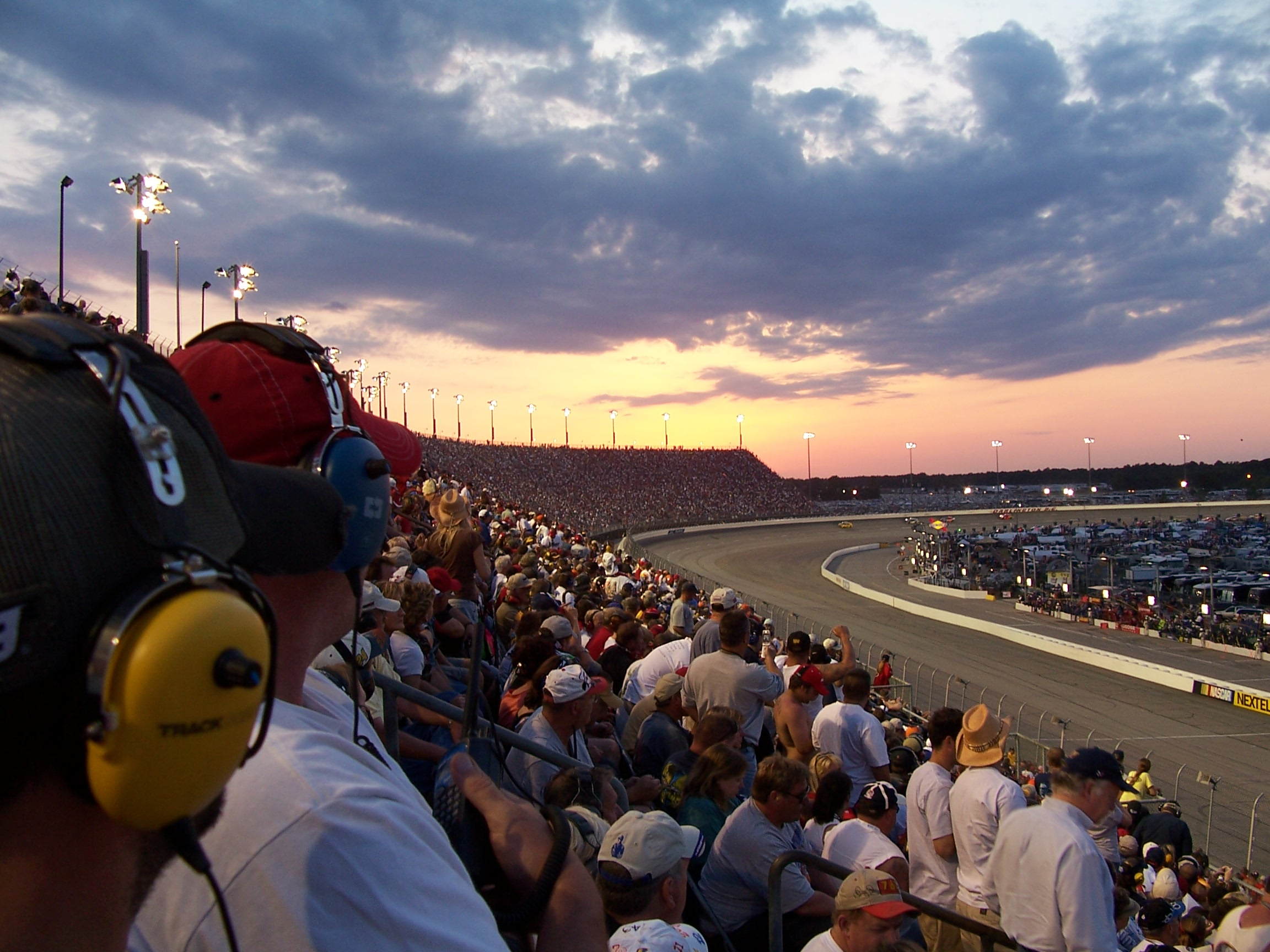
Darlington Raceway, the circuit where the race will be held.

Darlington Raceway is a race track built for NASCAR racing located near Darlington, South Carolina. It is nicknamed "The Lady in Black" and "The Track Too Tough to Tame" by many NASCAR fans and drivers and advertised as "A NASCAR Tradition." It is of a unique, somewhat egg-shaped design, an oval with the ends of very different configurations, a condition which supposedly arose from the proximity of one end of the track to a minnow pond the owner refused to relocate. This situation makes it very challenging for the crews to set up their cars' handling in a way that is effective at both ends.

Since 2015, the race has hosted NASCAR's Throwback weekend, which features cars sporting paint schemes that pay homage to past teams and drivers. (The lineage of this race includes races billed as the Southern 500 from 2005 to 2020.)

=== Entry list ===
- (R) denotes rookie driver.
- (i) denotes driver who is ineligible for series driver points.

#	Driver	Team	Make	Sponsor or throwback
1	Colby Howard	Tricon Garage	Toyota	Coastal Sports Cards
02	Mason Massey	Young's Motorsports	Chevrolet	Randco Industries
2	Nick Sanchez	Rev Racing	Chevrolet	Drive for Diversity 20th Anniversary
5	Dean Thompson	Tricon Garage	Toyota	Thompson Pipe Group – Ryan Partridge's No. 48 truck paint scheme.
7	Kyle Busch (i)	Spire Motorsports	Chevrolet	BAMF Enterprises
9	Grant Enfinger	CR7 Motorsports	Chevrolet	Champion Power Equipment
11	Corey Heim	Tricon Garage	Toyota	Safelite – Cale Yarborough's 1974 Southern 500 paint scheme.
13	Jake Garcia	ThorSport Racing	Ford	Quanta Services
15	Tanner Gray	Tricon Garage	Toyota	Dead On Tools – Gray's 2018 No. 15 NHRA paint scheme.
17	Taylor Gray	Tricon Garage	Toyota	ShopTRICON.com – Mark Green's 2000 No. 63 Superflo paint scheme.
18	Tyler Ankrum	McAnally-Hilgemann Racing	Chevrolet	LiUNA! – Russ Wheeler's paint scheme from Days of Thunder.
19	Christian Eckes	McAnally-Hilgemann Racing	Chevrolet	Gates Hydraulics – Brownie King's 1950s-60s paint scheme.
22	Mason Maggio	Reaume Brothers Racing	Ford	Crawford Garage Doors – Eugene Leicht Sr.'s late model paint scheme.
25	Ty Dillon	Rackley WAR	Chevrolet	Rackley Roofing
32	Bret Holmes	Bret Holmes Racing	Chevrolet	Golden Eagle Syrup – Bobby Allison's 1969 No. 22 Dodge paint scheme.
33	Lawless Alan	Reaume Brothers Racing	Ford	AutoParkIt.com – Ricky Schlick's No. 24 Legends car paint scheme.
38	Layne Riggs (R)	Front Row Motorsports	Ford	Infinity Communications Group – Scott Riggs' 2000 No. 86 RC Cola paint scheme.
41	Bayley Currey	Niece Motorsports	Chevrolet	AutoVentive / Precision – Chuck Efaw's 1980 dirt late model paint scheme.
42	Matt Mills	Niece Motorsports	Chevrolet	J. F. Electric / Utilitra
43	Daniel Dye	McAnally-Hilgemann Racing	Chevrolet	Peak – Kyle Petty's 1989 No. 42 Peak paint scheme.
45	Ross Chastain (i)	Niece Motorsports	Chevrolet	Buckle Up South Carolina
46	Thad Moffitt (R)	Faction46	Chevrolet	Petty 75 Years of Racing – Bobby Hamilton's 1996 No. 43 STP paint scheme.
52	Stewart Friesen	Halmar Friesen Racing	Toyota	Halmar International – Jimmie Johnson's 2010 No. 48 Lowe's Coke 600 paint scheme.
56	Timmy Hill	Hill Motorsports	Toyota	UNITS Storage
66	Conner Jones (R)	ThorSport Racing	Ford	TSport
71	Rajah Caruth	Spire Motorsports	Chevrolet	HendrickCars.com
76	Spencer Boyd	Freedom Racing Enterprises	Chevrolet	Freedom Warranty – Buck Baker's 1949 paint scheme.
77	Chase Purdy	Spire Motorsports	Chevrolet	Bama Buggies
88	Matt Crafton	ThorSport Racing	Ford	Chi-Chi's / Menards
91	Jack Wood	McAnally-Hilgemann Racing	Chevrolet	RTIC Outdoors – Tim Flock's 1952 No. 91 paint scheme.
98	Ty Majeski	ThorSport Racing	Ford	Soda Sense / Curb Records
99	Ben Rhodes	ThorSport Racing	Ford	Campers Inn RV
Official entry list

== Practice ==
The first and only practice was held on Friday, May 10, at 3:05 PM EST, and would last for 20 minutes. Christian Eckes, driving for McAnally-Hilgemann Racing, would set the fastest time in the session, with a lap of 29.540, and a speed of 166.473 mph (267.912 km/h).

Pos.	#	Driver	Team	Make	Time	Speed
1	19	Christian Eckes	McAnally-Hilgemann Racing	Chevrolet	29.540	166.473
2	15	Tanner Gray	Tricon Garage	Toyota	29.807	164.981
3	9	Grant Enfinger	CR7 Motorsports	Chevrolet	29.894	164.501
Full practice results

== Qualifying ==
Qualifying was held on Friday, May 10, at 3:35 PM EST. Since Darlington Raceway is an intermediate speedway, the qualifying system used is a single-car, single-lap system with only one round. Drivers will be on track by themselves and will have one lap to post a qualifying time. Whoever sets the fastest time in that round will win the pole.

Nick Sanchez, driving for Rev Racing, would score the pole for the race, with a lap of 29.288, and a speed of 167.905 mph (270.217 km/h).

No drivers would fail to qualify.

=== Qualifying results ===
Pos.	#	Driver	Team	Make	Time	Speed
1	2	Nick Sanchez	Rev Racing	Chevrolet	29.288	167.905
2	11	Corey Heim	Tricon Garage	Toyota	29.436	167.061
3	17	Taylor Gray	Tricon Garage	Toyota	29.438	167.049
4	7	Kyle Busch (i)	Spire Motorsports	Chevrolet	29.488	166.766
5	15	Tanner Gray	Tricon Garage	Toyota	29.507	166.659
6	45	Ross Chastain (i)	Niece Motorsports	Chevrolet	29.517	166.602
7	19	Christian Eckes	McAnally-Hilgemann Racing	Chevrolet	29.576	166.270
8	38	Layne Riggs (R)	Front Row Motorsports	Ford	29.616	166.045
9	9	Grant Enfinger	CR7 Motorsports	Chevrolet	29.650	165.855
10	43	Daniel Dye	McAnally-Hilgemann Racing	Chevrolet	29.656	165.821
11	52	Stewart Friesen	Halmar Friesen Racing	Toyota	29.789	165.081
12	99	Ben Rhodes	ThorSport Racing	Ford	29.891	164.518
13	5	Dean Thompson	Tricon Garage	Toyota	29.912	164.402
14	13	Jake Garcia	ThorSport Racing	Ford	29.927	164.320
15	25	Ty Dillon	Rackley WAR	Chevrolet	29.932	164.292
16	98	Ty Majeski	ThorSport Racing	Ford	29.978	164.040
17	41	Bayley Currey	Niece Motorsports	Chevrolet	30.011	163.860
18	1	Colby Howard	Tricon Garage	Toyota	30.042	163.691
19	77	Chase Purdy	Spire Motorsports	Chevrolet	30.068	163.549
20	88	Matt Crafton	ThorSport Racing	Ford	30.126	163.234
21	66	Conner Jones (R)	ThorSport Racing	Ford	30.198	162.845
22	33	Lawless Alan	Reaume Brothers Racing	Ford	30.232	162.662
23	91	Jack Wood	McAnally-Hilgemann Racing	Chevrolet	30.273	162.442
24	18	Tyler Ankrum	McAnally-Hilgemann Racing	Chevrolet	30.284	162.383
25	42	Matt Mills	Niece Motorsports	Chevrolet	30.323	162.174
26	71	Rajah Caruth	Spire Motorsports	Chevrolet	30.350	162.030
27	56	Timmy Hill	Hill Motorsports	Toyota	30.564	160.895
28	32	Bret Holmes	Bret Holmes Racing	Chevrolet	30.738	159.984
29	02	Mason Massey	Young's Motorsports	Chevrolet	30.817	159.574
30	76	Spencer Boyd	Freedom Racing Enterprises	Chevrolet	31.453	156.348
31	22	Mason Maggio	Reaume Brothers Racing	Ford	31.558	155.827
Qualified by owner's points
32	46	Thad Moffitt (R)	Faction46	Chevrolet	31.977	153.786
Official qualifying results
Official starting lineup

== Race results ==
Stage 1 Laps: 45

Pos.	#	Driver	Team	Make	Pts
1	11	Corey Heim	Tricon Garage	Toyota	10
2	19	Christian Eckes	McAnally-Hilgemann Racing	Chevrolet	9
3	98	Ty Majeski	ThorSport Racing	Ford	8
4	17	Taylor Gray	Tricon Garage	Toyota	7
4	38	Layne Riggs (R)	Front Row Motorsports	Ford	6
5	45	Ross Chastain (i)	Niece Motorsports	Chevrolet	0
6	5	Dean Thompson	Tricon Garage	Toyota	4
7	99	Ben Rhodes	ThorSport Racing	Ford	3
9	52	Stewart Friesen	Halmar Friesen Racing	Toyota	2
10	9	Grant Enfinger	CR7 Motorsports	Chevrolet	1

Stage 2 Laps: 45

Pos.	#	Driver	Team	Make	Pts
1	11	Corey Heim	Tricon Garage	Toyota	10
2	71	Rajah Caruth	Spire Motorsports	Chevrolet	9
3	19	Christian Eckes	McAnally-Hilgemann Racing	Chevrolet	8
4	98	Ty Majeski	ThorSport Racing	Ford	7
5	9	Grant Enfinger	CR7 Motorsports	Chevrolet	6
6	88	Matt Crafton	Tricon Garage	Toyota	5
7	38	Layne Riggs (R)	Front Row Motorsports	Ford	4
8	45	Ross Chastain (i)	Niece Motorsports	Chevrolet	0
9	17	Taylor Gray	Tricon Garage	Toyota	2
10	13	Jake Garcia	ThorSport Racing	Ford	1

Stage 3 Laps: 60

Pos.	St	#	Driver	Team	Make	Laps	Led	Status	Pts
1	6	45	Ross Chastain (i)	Niece Motorsports	Chevrolet	150	3	Running	0
2	1	2	Nick Sanchez	Rev Racing	Chevrolet	150	0	Running	35
3	12	99	Ben Rhodes	ThorSport Racing	Ford	150	0	Running	37
4	7	19	Christian Eckes	McAnally-Hilgemann Racing	Chevrolet	150	15	Running	50
5	16	98	Ty Majeski	ThorSport Racing	Ford	150	36	Running	47
6	19	77	Chase Purdy	Spire Motorsports	Chevrolet	150	0	Running	31
7	18	1	Colby Howard	Tricon Garage	Toyota	150	0	Running	30
8	3	17	Taylor Gray	Tricon Garage	Toyota	150	16	Running	38
9	15	25	Ty Dillon	Rackley WAR	Chevrolet	150	0	Running	28
10	5	15	Tanner Gray	Tricon Garage	Toyota	150	0	Running	27
11	25	42	Matt Mills	Niece Motorsports	Chevrolet	150	0	Running	26
12	22	33	Lawless Alan	Reaume Brothers Racing	Ford	150	0	Running	25
13	27	56	Timmy Hill	Hill Motorsports	Toyota	150	0	Running	24
14	11	52	Stewart Friesen	Halmar Friesen Racing	Toyota	150	0	Running	25
15	29	02	Mason Massey	Young’s Motorsports	Chevrolet	150	0	Running	22
16	9	9	Grant Enfinger	CR7 Motorsports	Chevrolet	150	3	Running	28
17	28	32	Bret Holmes	Bret Holmes Racing	Chevrolet	150	0	Running	20
18	32	46	Thad Moffitt (R)	Faction46	Chevrolet	150	0	Running	19
19	30	76	Spencer Boyd	Freedom Racing Enterprises	Chevrolet	150	0	Running	18
20	14	13	Jake Garcia	ThorSport Racing	Ford	150	0	Running	18
21	8	38	Layne Riggs (R)	Front Row Motorsports	Ford	148	0	Running	26
22	17	41	Bayley Currey	Niece Motorsports	Chevrolet	148	0	Running	15
23	10	43	Daniel Dye	McAnally-Hilgemann Racing	Chevrolet	148	0	Running	14
24	21	66	Connor Jones (R)	ThorSport Racing	Ford	145	0	Running	13
25	23	91	Jack Wood	McAnally-Hilgemann Racing	Chevrolet	139	0	Accident	12
26	24	18	Tyler Ankrum	McAnally-Hilgemann Racing	Chevrolet	136	0	Running	11
27	31	22	Mason Maggio	Reaume Brothers Racing	Ford	121	0	Brakes	10
28	2	11	Corey Heim	Tricon Garage	Toyota	105	77	Accident	29
29	13	5	Dean Thompson	Tricon Garage	Toyota	97	0	Accident	12
30	26	71	Rajah Caruth	Spire Motorsports	Chevrolet	97	0	Accident	16
31	20	88	Matt Crafton	ThorSport Racing	Ford	97	0	Accident	11
32	4	7	Kyle Busch (i)	Spire Motorsports	Chevrolet	6	0	Accident	0
Official race results

== Standing after the race ==
Drivers' Championship standings

	Pos	Driver	Points
1	1	Christian Eckes	387
1	2	Corey Heim	373 (-14)
	3	Nick Sanchez	330 (–57)
	4	Ty Majeski	326 (–61)
2	5	Taylor Gray	297 (–90)
	6	Rajah Caruth	276 (–111)
2	5	Tyler Ankrum	275 (–112)
	8	Matt Crafton	233 (–154)
	9	Tanner Gray	228 (–159)
2	10	Ben Rhodes	225 (–162)
Official driver's standings

Manufacturers' Championship standings

Pos	Manufacturer	Points
1	Chevrolet	348
2	Toyota	309 (-39)
3	Ford	284 (–64)

- Note: Only the first 10 positions are included for the driver standings.

Previous race: 2024 Heart of America 200	NASCAR Craftsman Truck Series; 2024 season	Next race: 2024 Wright Brand 250
