= 2023 North Carolina Education Lottery 200 =

11th race of the 2023 NASCAR Craftsman Truck Series

Race details
- Race 11 of 23 of the 2023 NASCAR Craftsman Truck Series
- Date: May 26, 2023
- Official name: 20th Annual North Carolina Education Lottery 200
- Location: Charlotte Motor Speedway, Concord, North Carolina
- Course: Permanent racing facility
- Course length: 1.5 miles (2.4 km)
- Distance: 134 laps, 201 mi (323 km)
- Scheduled distance: 134 laps, 201 mi (323 km)
- Average speed: 116.898 mph (188.129 km/h)

Pole position
Driver	Tanner Gray	Tricon Garage
- Time: 29.936

Most laps led
Driver	Corey Heim	Tricon Garage
- Laps: 49

Winner
No. 99	Ben Rhodes	ThorSport Racing

Television in the United States
- Network: FS1
- Announcers: Adam Alexander, Phil Parsons, and Michael Waltrip

Radio in the United States
- Radio: MRN

The 2023 North Carolina Education Lottery 200 was the 11th stock car race of the 2023 NASCAR Craftsman Truck Series, the first race of the Triple Truck Challenge, and the 20th iteration of the event.

The race was held on Friday, May 26, 2023, in Concord, North Carolina at Charlotte Motor Speedway, a 1.5 miles (2.4 km) permanent tri-oval shaped racetrack. The race took the scheduled 134 laps to complete. Ben Rhodes, driving for ThorSport Racing, took advantage of a pit road strategy and dominated the final portion of the race to earn his 7th career NASCAR Craftsman Truck Series win and his first of the season. He also earns the additional $50,000 for winning the first Triple Truck Challenge race. Corey Heim and Carson Hocevar dominated the majority of the race, leading 49 and 43 laps, respectively.

To fill out the podium, Heim, driving for Tricon Garage, and Dean Thompson, also driving for Tricon Garage, finished 2nd and 3rd, respectively.

== Background ==
Charlotte Motor Speedway (previously known as Lowe's Motor Speedway from 1999 to 2009) is a motorsport complex located in Concord, North Carolina, 13-mile (21 km) outside Charlotte. The complex features a 1.500 mi (2.414 km) quad oval track that hosts NASCAR racing including the prestigious Coca-Cola 600 on Memorial Day weekend, and the Bank of America Roval 400. The speedway was built in 1959 by Bruton Smith and is considered the home track for NASCAR with many race teams located in the Charlotte area. The track is owned and operated by Speedway Motorsports with Greg Walter as track president.

The 2,000 acres (8.1 km^{2}) complex also features a state-of-the-art 0.250 mi (0.402 km) drag racing strip, ZMAX Dragway. It is the only all-concrete, four-lane drag strip in the United States and hosts NHRA events. Alongside the drag strip is a state-of-the-art clay oval that hosts dirt racing including the World of Outlaws finals among other popular racing events.

=== Entry list ===
- (R) denotes rookie driver.

#	Driver	Team	Make
1	David Gilliland	Tricon Garage	Toyota
02	Kris Wright	Young's Motorsports	Chevrolet
2	Nick Sanchez (R)	Rev Racing	Chevrolet
04	Johnny Sauter	Roper Racing	Ford
4	Chase Purdy	Kyle Busch Motorsports	Chevrolet
5	Dean Thompson	Tricon Garage	Toyota
9	Colby Howard	CR7 Motorsports	Chevrolet
11	Corey Heim	Tricon Garage	Toyota
12	Spencer Boyd	Young's Motorsports	Chevrolet
13	Hailie Deegan	ThorSport Racing	Ford
15	Tanner Gray	Tricon Garage	Toyota
16	Tyler Ankrum	Hattori Racing Enterprises	Toyota
17	Taylor Gray (R)	Tricon Garage	Toyota
19	Christian Eckes	McAnally-Hilgemann Racing	Chevrolet
20	Matt Mills	Young's Motorsports	Chevrolet
22	Mason Maggio	AM Racing	Ford
23	Grant Enfinger	GMS Racing	Chevrolet
24	Rajah Caruth (R)	GMS Racing	Chevrolet
25	Matt DiBenedetto	Rackley WAR	Chevrolet
30	Ryan Vargas	On Point Motorsports	Toyota
32	Bret Holmes (R)	Bret Holmes Racing	Chevrolet
33	Josh Reaume	Reaume Brothers Racing	Ford
34	Keith McGee	Reaume Brothers Racing	Ford
35	Jake Garcia (R)	McAnally-Hilgemann Racing	Chevrolet
38	Zane Smith	Front Row Motorsports	Ford
41	Bayley Currey	Niece Motorsports	Chevrolet
42	Carson Hocevar	Niece Motorsports	Chevrolet
43	Daniel Dye (R)	GMS Racing	Chevrolet
45	Lawless Alan	Niece Motorsports	Chevrolet
46	Armani Williams	G2G Racing	Toyota
51	Jack Wood	Kyle Busch Motorsports	Chevrolet
52	Stewart Friesen	Halmar Friesen Racing	Toyota
56	Tyler Hill	Hill Motorsports	Toyota
88	Matt Crafton	ThorSport Racing	Ford
90	Justin Carroll	TC Motorsports	Toyota
98	Ty Majeski	ThorSport Racing	Ford
99	Ben Rhodes	ThorSport Racing	Ford
Official entry list

== Practice ==
The first and only practice session was held on Friday, May 26, at 1:35 PM EST, and would last for 20 minutes. Ty Majeski, driving for ThorSport Racing, would set the fastest time in the session, with a lap of 30.100, and an average speed of 179.402 mph (288.720 km/h).

Pos.	#	Driver	Team	Make	Time	Speed
1	98	Ty Majeski	ThorSport Racing	Ford	30.100	179.402
2	17	Taylor Gray (R)	Tricon Garage	Toyota	30.254	178.489
3	42	Carson Hocevar	Niece Motorsports	Chevrolet	30.302	178.206
Full practice results

== Qualifying ==
Qualifying was held on Friday, May 26, at 2:05 PM EST. Since Charlotte Motor Speedway is an intermediate racetrack, the qualifying system used is a single-car, one-lap system with only one round. In that round, whoever sets the fastest time will win the pole. Tanner Gray, driving for Tricon Garage, would score the pole for the race, with a lap of 29.936, and an average speed of 180.385 mph (290.302 km/h).

Pos.	#	Driver	Team	Make	Time	Speed
1	15	Tanner Gray	Tricon Garage	Toyota	29.936	180.385
2	98	Ty Majeski	ThorSport Racing	Ford	29.970	180.180
3	11	Corey Heim	Tricon Garage	Toyota	29.983	180.102
4	24	Rajah Caruth (R)	GMS Racing	Chevrolet	30.070	179.581
5	52	Stewart Friesen	Halmar Friesen Racing	Toyota	30.141	179.158
6	19	Christian Eckes	McAnally-Hilgemann Racing	Chevrolet	30.151	179.099
7	5	Dean Thompson	Tricon Garage	Toyota	30.155	179.075
8	41	Bayley Currey	Niece Motorsports	Chevrolet	30.240	178.571
9	1	David Gilliland	Tricon Garage	Toyota	30.242	178.560
10	51	Jack Wood	Kyle Busch Motorsports	Chevrolet	30.309	178.165
11	23	Grant Enfinger	GMS Racing	Chevrolet	30.320	178.100
12	42	Carson Hocevar	Niece Motorsports	Chevrolet	30.320	178.100
13	4	Chase Purdy	Kyle Busch Motorsports	Chevrolet	30.348	177.936
14	38	Zane Smith	Front Row Motorsports	Ford	30.363	177.848
15	35	Jake Garcia (R)	McAnally-Hilgemann Racing	Chevrolet	30.390	177.690
16	45	Lawless Alan	Niece Motorsports	Chevrolet	30.397	177.649
17	17	Taylor Gray (R)	Tricon Garage	Toyota	30.418	177.526
18	43	Daniel Dye (R)	GMS Racing	Chevrolet	30.483	177.148
19	99	Ben Rhodes	ThorSport Racing	Ford	30.500	177.049
20	25	Matt DiBenedetto	Rackley WAR	Chevrolet	30.550	176.759
21	13	Hailie Deegan	ThorSport Racing	Ford	30.913	174.684
22	9	Colby Howard	CR7 Motorsports	Chevrolet	30.979	174.312
23	02	Kris Wright	Young's Motorsports	Chevrolet	31.014	174.115
24	88	Matt Crafton	ThorSport Racing	Ford	31.062	173.846
25	12	Spencer Boyd	Young's Motorsports	Chevrolet	31.302	172.513
26	32	Bret Holmes (R)	Bret Holmes Racing	Chevrolet	31.427	171.827
27	33	Josh Reaume	Reaume Brothers Racing	Ford	31.555	171.130
28	20	Matt Mills	Young's Motorsports	Chevrolet	31.877	169.401
29	56	Tyler Hill	Hill Motorsports	Toyota	32.050	168.487
30	46	Armani Williams	G2G Racing	Toyota	32.279	167.291
31	22	Mason Maggio	AM Racing	Ford	32.306	167.152
Qualified by owner's points
32	90	Justin Carroll	TC Motorsports	Toyota	32.760	164.835
33	34	Keith McGee	Reaume Brothers Racing	Ford	32.921	164.029
34	2	Nick Sanchez (R)	Rev Racing	Chevrolet	–	–
35	16	Tyler Ankrum	Hattori Racing Enterprises	Toyota	–	–
36	30	Ryan Vargas	On Point Motorsports	Toyota	–	–
Withdrew
37	04	Johnny Sauter	Roper Racing	Ford	–	–
Official qualifying results
Official starting lineup

== Race results ==
Stage 1 Laps: 30

Pos.	#	Driver	Team	Make	Pts
1	11	Corey Heim	Tricon Garage	Toyota	10
2	42	Carson Hocevar	Niece Motorsports	Chevrolet	9
3	5	Dean Thompson	Tricon Garage	Toyota	8
4	24	Rajah Caruth (R)	GMS Racing	Chevrolet	7
5	38	Zane Smith	Front Row Motorsports	Ford	6
6	98	Ty Majeski	ThorSport Racing	Ford	5
7	15	Tanner Gray	Tricon Garage	Toyota	4
8	52	Stewart Friesen	Halmar Friesen Racing	Toyota	3
9	1	David Gilliland	Tricon Garage	Toyota	2
10	17	Taylor Gray (R)	Tricon Garage	Toyota	1

Stage 2 Laps: 30

Pos.	#	Driver	Team	Make	Pts
1	42	Carson Hocevar	Niece Motorsports	Chevrolet	10
2	11	Corey Heim	Tricon Garage	Toyota	9
3	5	Dean Thompson	Tricon Garage	Toyota	8
4	38	Zane Smith	Front Row Motorsports	Ford	7
5	52	Stewart Friesen	Halmar Friesen Racing	Toyota	6
6	17	Taylor Gray (R)	Tricon Garage	Toyota	5
7	99	Ben Rhodes	ThorSport Racing	Ford	4
8	1	David Gilliland	Tricon Garage	Toyota	3
9	2	Nick Sanchez (R)	Rev Racing	Chevrolet	2
10	19	Christian Eckes	McAnally-Hilgemann Racing	Chevrolet	1

Stage 3 Laps: 74

Fin	St	#	Driver	Team	Make	Laps	Led	Status	Pts
1	19	99	Ben Rhodes	ThorSport Racing	Ford	134	37	Running	44
2	3	11	Corey Heim	Tricon Garage	Toyota	134	49	Running	54
3	7	5	Dean Thompson	Tricon Garage	Toyota	134	0	Running	50
4	12	42	Carson Hocevar	Niece Motorsports	Chevrolet	134	43	Running	52
5	11	23	Grant Enfinger	GMS Racing	Chevrolet	134	0	Running	32
6	6	19	Christian Eckes	McAnally-Hilgemann Racing	Chevrolet	134	0	Running	32
7	2	98	Ty Majeski	ThorSport Racing	Ford	134	0	Running	35
8	20	25	Matt DiBenedetto	Rackley WAR	Chevrolet	134	0	Running	29
9	34	2	Nick Sanchez (R)	Rev Racing	Chevrolet	134	0	Running	30
10	17	17	Taylor Gray (R)	Tricon Garage	Toyota	134	0	Running	33
11	4	24	Rajah Caruth (R)	GMS Racing	Chevrolet	134	0	Running	33
12	24	88	Matt Crafton	ThorSport Racing	Ford	134	0	Running	25
13	8	41	Bayley Currey	Niece Motorsports	Chevrolet	134	0	Running	24
14	9	1	David Gilliland	Tricon Garage	Toyota	134	0	Running	28
15	15	35	Jake Garcia (R)	McAnally-Hilgemann Racing	Chevrolet	134	0	Running	22
16	13	4	Chase Purdy	Kyle Busch Motorsports	Chevrolet	134	2	Running	21
17	16	45	Lawless Alan	Niece Motorsports	Chevrolet	134	0	Running	20
18	10	51	Jack Wood	Kyle Busch Motorsports	Chevrolet	134	0	Running	19
19	18	43	Daniel Dye (R)	GMS Racing	Chevrolet	134	0	Running	18
20	22	9	Colby Howard	CR7 Motorsports	Chevrolet	134	0	Running	17
21	26	32	Bret Holmes (R)	Bret Holmes Racing	Chevrolet	134	0	Running	16
22	5	52	Stewart Friesen	Halmar Friesen Racing	Toyota	134	0	Running	24
23	14	38	Zane Smith	Front Row Motorsports	Ford	134	0	Running	27
24	29	56	Tyler Hill	Hill Motorsports	Toyota	134	0	Running	13
25	31	22	Mason Maggio	AM Racing	Ford	134	0	Running	12
26	36	30	Ryan Vargas	On Point Motorsports	Toyota	134	0	Running	11
27	1	15	Tanner Gray	Tricon Garage	Toyota	133	3	Running	14
28	35	16	Tyler Ankrum	Hattori Racing Enterprises	Toyota	132	0	Running	9
29	27	33	Josh Reaume	Reaume Brothers Racing	Ford	131	0	Running	8
30	28	20	Matt Mills	Young's Motorsports	Chevrolet	131	0	Running	7
31	25	12	Spencer Boyd	Young's Motorsports	Chevrolet	131	0	Running	6
32	23	02	Kris Wright	Young's Motorsports	Chevrolet	130	0	Running	5
33	21	13	Hailie Deegan	ThorSport Racing	Ford	128	0	Running	4
34	32	90	Justin Carroll	TC Motorsports	Toyota	122	0	Running	3
35	30	46	Armani Williams	G2G Racing	Toyota	65	0	Accident	2
36	33	34	Keith McGee	Reaume Brothers Racing	Ford	20	0	Fuel Pump	1
Official race results

== Standings after the race ==
Drivers' Championship standings

	Pos	Driver	Points
	1	Corey Heim	425
	2	Ty Majeski	399 (-26)
	3	Zane Smith	382 (-43)
	4	Grant Enfinger	362 (-63)
1	5	Ben Rhodes	349 (-76)
1	6	Christian Eckes	343 (-82)
	7	Matt Crafton	315 (-110)
3	8	Carson Hocevar	302 (-123)
1	9	Tanner Gray	287 (-138)
	10	Matt DiBenedetto	281 (-144)
Official driver's standings

- Note: Only the first 10 positions are included for the driver standings.

Previous race: 2023 Tyson 250	NASCAR Craftsman Truck Series; 2023 season	Next race: 2023 Toyota 200
