= 2022 Baptist Health 200 =

22nd race of the 2022 NASCAR Camping World Truck Series

Race details
- Race 22 of 23 of the 2022 NASCAR Camping World Truck Series
- Date: October 22, 2022
- Official name: 26th Annual Baptist Health 200
- Location: Homestead–Miami Speedway, Homestead, Florida
- Course: Permanent racing facility
- Course length: 1.5 miles (2.4 km)
- Distance: 134 laps, 201 mi (323 km)
- Average speed: 133.137 mph (214.263 km/h)

Pole position
Driver	Ryan Preece	David Gilliland Racing
- Grid positions set by competition-based formula

Most laps led
Driver	Ty Majeski	ThorSport Racing
- Laps: 67

Winner
No. 66	Ty Majeski	ThorSport Racing

Television in the United States
- Network: Fox Sports 1
- Announcers: Vince Welch, Phil Parsons, and Michael Waltrip

Radio in the United States
- Radio: Motor Racing Network

The 2022 Baptist Health 200 was the 22nd stock car race of the 2022 NASCAR Camping World Truck Series, the final race of the Round of 8, and the 26th iteration of the event. The race was held on Saturday, October 22, 2022, in Homestead, Florida at Homestead–Miami Speedway, a 1.5 miles (2.4 km) permanent oval-shaped racetrack. The race took the scheduled 134 laps to complete. Ty Majeski, driving for ThorSport Racing, would take the lead during the middle of the race, and earned his second career NASCAR Camping World Truck Series win, along with his second of the season. Majeski mainly dominated the race as well, leading 67 laps. To fill out the podium, Zane Smith, driving for Front Row Motorsports, and Stewart Friesen, driving for Halmar Friesen Racing, would finish 2nd and 3rd, respectively.

The four drivers to advance into the championship 4 are Ty Majeski, Zane Smith, Chandler Smith, and Ben Rhodes.

== Background ==
Homestead–Miami Speedway is a motor racing track located in Homestead, Florida. The track, which has several configurations, has promoted several series of racing, including NASCAR, the IndyCar Series, the IMSA SportsCar Championship series, and the Championship Cup Series. Homestead–Miami Speedway hosted the final race of the season in all three of NASCAR's series as NASCAR Championship Weekend.

=== Entry list ===
- (R) denotes rookie driver.

#	Driver	Team	Make
1	Hailie Deegan	David Gilliland Racing	Ford
02	Kaz Grala	Young's Motorsports	Chevrolet
4	John Hunter Nemechek	Kyle Busch Motorsports	Toyota
5	Tyler Hill	Hill Motorsports	Toyota
9	Blaine Perkins (R)	CR7 Motorsports	Chevrolet
12	Spencer Boyd	Young's Motorsports	Chevrolet
15	Tanner Gray	David Gilliland Racing	Ford
16	Tyler Ankrum	Hattori Racing Enterprises	Toyota
17	Ryan Preece	David Gilliland Racing	Ford
18	Chandler Smith	Kyle Busch Motorsports	Toyota
19	Derek Kraus	McAnally–Hilgemann Racing	Chevrolet
20	Stefan Parsons	Young's Motorsports	Chevrolet
22	Max Gutiérrez	AM Racing	Chevrolet
23	Grant Enfinger	GMS Racing	Chevrolet
24	Jack Wood (R)	GMS Racing	Chevrolet
25	Matt DiBenedetto	Rackley W.A.R.	Chevrolet
30	Kaden Honeycutt	On Point Motorsports	Toyota
32	Bret Holmes	Bret Holmes Racing	Chevrolet
33	Nick Leitz	Reaume Brothers Racing	Toyota
38	Zane Smith	Front Row Motorsports	Ford
40	Dean Thompson (R)	Niece Motorsports	Chevrolet
42	Carson Hocevar	Niece Motorsports	Chevrolet
43	Mason Maggio	Reaume Brothers Racing	Toyota
44	Chad Chastain	Niece Motorsports	Chevrolet
45	Lawless Alan (R)	Niece Motorsports	Chevrolet
46	Brennan Poole	G2G Racing	Toyota
51	Corey Heim (R)	Kyle Busch Motorsports	Toyota
52	Stewart Friesen	Halmar Friesen Racing	Toyota
56	Timmy Hill	Hill Motorsports	Toyota
61	Chase Purdy	Hattori Racing Enterprises	Toyota
66	Ty Majeski	ThorSport Racing	Toyota
75	Parker Kligerman	Henderson Motorsports	Chevrolet
84	Clay Greenfield	Cook Racing Technologies	Toyota
88	Matt Crafton	ThorSport Racing	Toyota
91	Colby Howard	McAnally–Hilgemann Racing	Chevrolet
98	Christian Eckes	ThorSport Racing	Toyota
99	Ben Rhodes	ThorSport Racing	Toyota
Official entry list

== Practice ==
The only 20-minute practice session was held on Friday, October 21, at 4:00 PM EST. Christian Eckes, driving for ThorSport Racing, would set the fastest time in the session, with a lap of 32.466, and an average speed of 166.328 mph (267.679 km/h).

Pos.	#	Driver	Team	Make	Time	Speed
1	98	Christian Eckes	ThorSport Racing	Toyota	32.466	166.328
2	66	Ty Majeski	ThorSport Racing	Toyota	32.479	166.261
3	4	John Hunter Nemechek	Kyle Busch Motorsports	Toyota	32.553	165.883
Full practice results

== Qualifying ==
Qualifying was scheduled to be held on Friday, October 21, at 4:30 PM EST. Since Homestead–Miami Speedway is an oval track, the qualifying system used is a single-car, one-lap system with only one round. Whoever sets the fastest time in the round wins the pole. Qualifying was cancelled due to inclement weather. The starting lineup would be determined by a performance-based metric system. As a result, Ryan Preece, driving for David Gilliland Racing, would earn the pole. Clay Greenfield would fail to qualify.

Pos.	#	Driver	Team	Make
1	17	Ryan Preece	David Gilliland Racing	Ford
2	99	Ben Rhodes	ThorSport Racing	Toyota
3	25	Matt DiBenedetto	Rackley W.A.R.	Chevrolet
4	18	Chandler Smith	Kyle Busch Motorsports	Toyota
5	98	Christian Eckes	ThorSport Racing	Toyota
6	38	Zane Smith	Front Row Motorsports	Ford
7	1	Hailie Deegan	David Gilliland Racing	Ford
8	75	Parker Kligerman	Henderson Motorsports	Toyota
9	52	Stewart Friesen	Halmar Friesen Racing	Toyota
10	61	Chase Purdy	Hattori Racing Enterprises	Toyota
11	16	Tyler Ankrum	Hattori Racing Enterprises	Toyota
12	19	Derek Kraus	McAnally–Hilgemann Racing	Chevrolet
13	4	John Hunter Nemechek	Kyle Busch Motorsports	Toyota
14	91	Colby Howard	McAnally–Hilgemann Racing	Chevrolet
15	30	Kaden Honeycutt	On Point Motorsports	Toyota
16	02	Kaz Grala	Young's Motorsports	Chevrolet
17	32	Bret Holmes	Bret Holmes Racing	Chevrolet
18	66	Ty Majeski	ThorSport Racing	Toyota
19	51	Corey Heim (R)	Kyle Busch Motorsports	Toyota
20	88	Matt Crafton	ThorSport Racing	Toyota
21	56	Timmy Hill	Hill Motorsports	Toyota
22	42	Carson Hocevar	Niece Motorsports	Chevrolet
23	23	Grant Enfinger	GMS Racing	Chevrolet
24	24	Jack Wood (R)	GMS Racing	Chevrolet
25	15	Tanner Gray	David Gilliland Racing	Ford
26	9	Blaine Perkins (R)	CR7 Motorsports	Chevrolet
27	40	Dean Thompson (R)	Niece Motorsports	Chevrolet
28	45	Lawless Alan (R)	Niece Motorsports	Chevrolet
29	20	Stefan Parsons	Young's Motorsports	Chevrolet
30	44	Chad Chastain	Niece Motorsports	Chevrolet
31	22	Max Gutiérrez	AM Racing	Chevrolet
Qualified by owner's points
32	12	Spencer Boyd	Young's Motorsports	Chevrolet
33	33	Nick Leitz	Reaume Brothers Racing	Chevrolet
34	43	Mason Maggio	Reaume Brothers Racing	Toyota
35	46	Brennan Poole	G2G Racing	Toyota
36	5	Tyler Hill	Hill Motorsports	Toyota
Failed to qualify
37	84	Clay Greenfield	Cook Racing Technologies	Toyota
Official starting lineup

== Race results ==
Stage 1 Laps: 40

Pos.	#	Driver	Team	Make	Pts
1	99	Ben Rhodes	ThorSport Racing	Toyota	10
2	38	Zane Smith	Front Row Motorsports	Ford	9
3	52	Stewart Friesen	Halmar Friesen Racing	Toyota	8
4	66	Ty Majeski	ThorSport Racing	Toyota	7
5	23	Grant Enfinger	GMS Racing	Chevrolet	6
6	98	Christian Eckes	ThorSport Racing	Toyota	5
7	18	Chandler Smith	Kyle Busch Motorsports	Toyota	4
8	88	Matt Crafton	ThorSport Racing	Toyota	3
9	75	Parker Kligerman	Henderson Motorsports	Toyota	2
10	17	Ryan Preece	David Gilliland Racing	Ford	1

Stage 2 Laps: 40

Pos.	#	Driver	Team	Make	Pts
1	38	Zane Smith	Front Row Motorsports	Ford	10
2	66	Ty Majeski	ThorSport Racing	Toyota	9
3	17	Ryan Preece	David Gilliland Racing	Ford	8
4	52	Stewart Friesen	Halmar Friesen Racing	Toyota	7
5	99	Ben Rhodes	ThorSport Racing	Toyota	6
6	98	Christian Eckes	ThorSport Racing	Toyota	5
7	23	Grant Enfinger	GMS Racing	Chevrolet	4
8	91	Colby Howard	McAnally–Hilgemann Racing	Chevrolet	3
9	51	Corey Heim (R)	Kyle Busch Motorsports	Toyota	2
10	18	Chandler Smith	Kyle Busch Motorsports	Toyota	1

Stage 3 Laps: 54

Fin.	St	#	Driver	Team	Make	Laps	Led	Status	Pts
1	18	66	Ty Majeski	ThorSport Racing	Toyota	134	67	Running	56
2	6	38	Zane Smith	Front Row Motorsports	Ford	134	26	Running	54
3	9	52	Stewart Friesen	Halmar Friesen Racing	Toyota	134	0	Running	49
4	1	17	Ryan Preece	David Gilliland Racing	Ford	134	2	Running	42
5	19	51	Corey Heim (R)	Kyle Busch Motorsports	Toyota	134	0	Running	34
6	2	99	Ben Rhodes	ThorSport Racing	Toyota	134	37	Running	47
7	5	98	Christian Eckes	ThorSport Racing	Toyota	134	0	Running	40
8	20	88	Matt Crafton	ThorSport Racing	Toyota	134	0	Running	32
9	8	75	Parker Kligerman	Henderson Motorsports	Toyota	134	0	Running	30
10	4	18	Chandler Smith	Kyle Busch Motorsports	Toyota	134	0	Running	32
11	11	16	Tyler Ankrum	Hattori Racing Enterprises	Toyota	133	0	Running	26
12	22	42	Carson Hocevar	Niece Motorsports	Chevrolet	133	0	Running	25
13	14	91	Colby Howard	McAnally–Hilgemann Racing	Chevrolet	133	0	Running	27
14	23	23	Grant Enfinger	GMS Racing	Chevrolet	133	0	Running	33
15	12	19	Derek Kraus	McAnally–Hilgemann Racing	Chevrolet	133	0	Running	22
16	10	61	Chase Purdy	Hattori Racing Enterprises	Toyota	133	0	Running	21
17	7	1	Hailie Deegan	David Gilliland Racing	Ford	133	0	Running	20
18	16	02	Kaz Grala	Young's Motorsports	Chevrolet	133	0	Running	19
19	3	25	Matt DiBenedetto	Rackley W.A.R.	Chevrolet	133	0	Running	18
20	21	56	Timmy Hill	Hill Motorsports	Toyota	133	2	Running	17
21	31	22	Max Gutiérrez	AM Racing	Chevrolet	133	0	Running	16
22	26	9	Blaine Perkins (R)	CR7 Motorsports	Chevrolet	132	0	Running	15
23	27	40	Dean Thompson (R)	Niece Motorsports	Chevrolet	132	0	Running	14
24	35	46	Brennan Poole	G2G Racing	Toyota	132	0	Running	13
25	25	15	Tanner Gray	David Gilliland Racing	Ford	132	0	Running	12
26	29	20	Stefan Parsons	Young's Motorsports	Chevrolet	132	0	Running	11
27	15	30	Kaden Honeycutt	On Point Motorsports	Toyota	132	0	Running	10
28	33	33	Nick Leitz	Reaume Brothers Racing	Chevrolet	131	0	Running	9
29	36	5	Tyler Hill	Hill Motorsports	Toyota	131	0	Running	8
30	30	44	Chad Chastain	Niece Motorsports	Chevrolet	131	0	Running	7
31	24	24	Jack Wood (R)	GMS Racing	Chevrolet	130	0	Running	6
32	34	43	Mason Maggio	Reaume Brothers Racing	Toyota	129	0	Running	5
33	17	32	Bret Holmes	Bret Holmes Racing	Chevrolet	129	0	Running	4
34	28	45	Lawless Alan (R)	Niece Motorsports	Chevrolet	129	0	Running	3
35	13	4	John Hunter Nemechek	Kyle Busch Motorsports	Toyota	128	0	Running	2
36	32	12	Spencer Boyd	Young's Motorsports	Chevrolet	124	0	Brakes	1
Official race results

== Standings after the race ==
Drivers' Championship standings

	Pos	Driver	Points
6	1	Ty Majeski	4,000
	2	Zane Smith	4,000 (-0)
	3	Ben Rhodes	4,000 (-0)
3	4	Chandler Smith	4,000 (-0)
1	5	John Hunter Nemechek	2,236 (-1,764)
1	6	Stewart Friesen	2,233 (-1,767)
1	7	Grant Enfinger	2,227 (-1,773)
4	8	Christian Eckes	2,221 (-1,779)
	9	Matt Crafton	2,172 (-1,828)
	10	Carson Hocevar	2,159 (-1,841)
Official driver's standings

- Note: Only the first 10 positions are included for the driver standings.

Previous race: 2022 Chevrolet Silverado 250	NASCAR Camping World Truck Series; 2022 season	Next race: 2022 Lucas Oil 150
