= 2023 Tyson 250 =

10th race of the 2023 NASCAR Craftsman Truck Series

Race details
- Race 10 of 23 of the 2023 NASCAR Craftsman Truck Series
- Date: May 20, 2023
- Location: North Wilkesboro Speedway, North Wilkesboro, North Carolina
- Course: Permanent racing facility
- Course length: 0.625 miles (1.006 km)
- Distance: 252 laps, 157 mi (252 km)
- Scheduled distance: 250 laps, 156 mi (251 km)
- Average speed: 68.769 mph (110.673 km/h)

Pole position
Driver	Corey Heim	Tricon Garage
- Time: 20.072

Most laps led
Driver	Kyle Larson	Spire Motorsports
- Laps: 138

Winner
No. 7	Kyle Larson	Spire Motorsports

Television in the United States
- Network: FOX
- Announcers: Adam Alexander, Phil Parsons, and Michael Waltrip

Radio in the United States
- Radio: MRN

The 2023 Tyson 250 was the 10th stock car race of the 2023 NASCAR Craftsman Truck Series, and the inaugural iteration of the event. The race took place on Saturday, May 20, 2023, in North Wilkesboro, North Carolina at North Wilkesboro Speedway, a 0.625 miles (1.006 km) permanent oval-shaped racetrack. The race was increased from 250 to 252 laps, due to a NASCAR overtime finish. In a wreck-filled race that caused twelve cautions, Kyle Larson, driving for Spire Motorsports, would put on a dominating performance, winning stage two and leading 138 laps, earning his third career NASCAR Craftsman Truck Series win, and his first of the season. To fill out the podium, Ty Majeski, driving for ThorSport Racing, and Matt DiBenedetto, driving for Rackley WAR, would finish 2nd and 3rd, respectively.

This event also marked the first Truck Series race to take place at North Wilkesboro Speedway for the first time since 1996.

== Background ==
North Wilkesboro Speedway is a short oval racetrack located on U.S. Route 421, about 5 mi (8.0 km) east of the town of North Wilkesboro, North Carolina, or 80 miles north of Charlotte. It measures 0.625 mi (1.006 km) and features a unique uphill backstretch and downhill frontstretch. It has previously held races in NASCAR's top three series, including 93 Winston Cup Series races. The track, a NASCAR original, operated from 1949, NASCAR's inception, until the track's original closure in 1996. The speedway briefly reopened in 2010 and hosted several stock car series races, including the now-defunct ASA Late Model Series, USARacing Pro Cup Series, and PASS super late models, before closing again in the spring of 2011. It was re-opened in August 2022 for grassroots racing and will host the 2023 NASCAR All-Star Race and a NASCAR Craftsman Truck Series race, with further renovations planned after the events.

=== Entry list ===
- (R) denotes rookie driver.
- (i) denotes driver who is ineligible for series driver points.

#	Driver	Team	Make
1	Bubba Wallace (i)	Tricon Garage	Toyota
02	Kris Wright	Young's Motorsports	Chevrolet
2	Nick Sanchez (R)	Rev Racing	Chevrolet
04	Johnny Sauter	Roper Racing	Ford
4	Chase Purdy	Kyle Busch Motorsports	Chevrolet
5	Dean Thompson	Tricon Garage	Toyota
6	Norm Benning	Norm Benning Racing	Chevrolet
7	Kyle Larson (i)	Spire Motorsports	Chevrolet
9	Colby Howard	CR7 Motorsports	Chevrolet
11	Corey Heim	Tricon Garage	Toyota
12	Spencer Boyd	Young's Motorsports	Chevrolet
13	Hailie Deegan	ThorSport Racing	Ford
15	Tanner Gray	Tricon Garage	Toyota
16	Tyler Ankrum	Hattori Racing Enterprises	Toyota
17	Taylor Gray (R)	Tricon Garage	Toyota
19	Christian Eckes	McAnally-Hilgemann Racing	Chevrolet
20	Kaden Honeycutt	Young's Motorsports	Chevrolet
22	Josh Williams (i)	AM Racing	Ford
23	Grant Enfinger	GMS Racing	Chevrolet
24	Rajah Caruth (R)	GMS Racing	Chevrolet
25	Matt DiBenedetto	Rackley WAR	Chevrolet
30	Chris Hacker	On Point Motorsports	Toyota
32	Bret Holmes (R)	Bret Holmes Racing	Chevrolet
33	Josh Reaume	Reaume Brothers Racing	Ford
35	Jake Garcia (R)	McAnally-Hilgemann Racing	Chevrolet
38	Zane Smith	Front Row Motorsports	Ford
41	Ross Chastain (i)	Niece Motorsports	Chevrolet
42	Carson Hocevar	Niece Motorsports	Chevrolet
43	Daniel Dye (R)	GMS Racing	Chevrolet
45	Lawless Alan	Niece Motorsports	Chevrolet
46	Akinori Ogata	G2G Racing	Toyota
51	William Byron (i)	Kyle Busch Motorsports	Chevrolet
52	Stewart Friesen	Halmar Friesen Racing	Toyota
56	Timmy Hill	Hill Motorsports	Toyota
61	Christopher Bell (i)	Hattori Racing Enterprises	Toyota
66	Conner Jones	ThorSport Racing	Ford
75	Parker Kligerman (i)	Henderson Motorsports	Chevrolet
88	Matt Crafton	ThorSport Racing	Ford
98	Ty Majeski	ThorSport Racing	Ford
99	Ben Rhodes	ThorSport Racing	Ford
Official entry list

== Practice ==
The first and only practice session was held on Friday, May 19, at 3:05 PM EST, and would last for 50 minutes. Carson Hocevar, driving for Niece Motorsports, would set the fastest time in the session, with a lap of 20.589, and an average speed of 109.282 mph (175.872 km/h).

Pos.	#	Driver	Team	Make	Time	Speed
1	42	Carson Hocevar	Niece Motorsports	Chevrolet	20.589	109.282
2	98	Ty Majeski	ThorSport Racing	Ford	20.594	109.255
3	4	Chase Purdy	Kyle Busch Motorsports	Chevrolet	20.642	109.001
Full practice results

== Qualifying ==
Qualifying was held on Saturday, May 20, at 10:30 AM EST. Since North Wilkesboro Speedway is a short track, the qualifying system used is a single-car, two-lap system with only one round. In that round, whoever sets the fastest time will win the pole. Corey Heim, driving for Tricon Garage, would score the pole for the race, with a lap of 20.072, and an average speed of 112.096 mph (180.401 km/h).

Pos.	#	Driver	Team	Make	Time	Speed
1	11	Corey Heim	Tricon Garage	Toyota	20.072	112.096
2	42	Carson Hocevar	Niece Motorsports	Chevrolet	20.156	111.629
3	98	Ty Majeski	ThorSport Racing	Ford	20.198	111.397
4	51	William Byron (i)	Kyle Busch Motorsports	Chevrolet	20.253	111.095
5	9	Colby Howard	CR7 Motorsports	Chevrolet	20.270	111.001
6	32	Bret Holmes (R)	Bret Holmes Racing	Chevrolet	20.271	110.996
7	23	Grant Enfinger	GMS Racing	Chevrolet	20.272	110.991
8	7	Kyle Larson (i)	Spire Motorsports	Chevrolet	20.279	110.952
9	61	Christopher Bell (i)	Hattori Racing Enterprises	Toyota	20.281	110.941
10	13	Hailie Deegan	ThorSport Racing	Ford	20.308	110.794
11	20	Kaden Honeycutt	Young's Motorsports	Chevrolet	20.326	110.696
12	41	Ross Chastain (i)	Niece Motorsports	Chevrolet	20.346	110.587
13	19	Christian Eckes	McAnally-Hilgemann Racing	Chevrolet	20.349	110.571
14	1	Bubba Wallace (i)	Tricon Garage	Toyota	20.352	110.554
15	25	Matt DiBenedetto	Rackley WAR	Chevrolet	20.388	110.359
16	43	Daniel Dye (R)	GMS Racing	Chevrolet	20.418	110.197
17	16	Tyler Ankrum	Hattori Racing Enterprises	Toyota	20.438	110.089
18	88	Matt Crafton	ThorSport Racing	Ford	20.449	110.030
19	99	Ben Rhodes	ThorSport Racing	Ford	20.453	110.008
20	2	Nick Sanchez (R)	Rev Racing	Chevrolet	20.499	109.761
21	35	Jake Garcia (R)	McAnally-Hilgemann Racing	Chevrolet	20.525	109.622
22	45	Lawless Alan	Niece Motorsports	Chevrolet	20.530	109.596
23	24	Rajah Caruth (R)	GMS Racing	Chevrolet	20.537	109.558
24	4	Chase Purdy	Kyle Busch Motorsports	Chevrolet	20.559	109.441
25	5	Dean Thompson	Tricon Garage	Toyota	20.559	109.441
26	56	Timmy Hill	Hill Motorsports	Toyota	20.562	109.425
27	17	Taylor Gray (R)	Tricon Garage	Toyota	20.564	109.415
28	22	Josh Williams (i)	AM Racing	Ford	20.565	109.409
29	04	Johnny Sauter	Roper Racing	Ford	20.569	109.388
30	66	Conner Jones	ThorSport Racing	Ford	20.609	109.176
31	15	Tanner Gray	Tricon Garage	Toyota	20.669	108.859
Qualified by owner's points
32	30	Chris Hacker	On Point Motorsports	Toyota	20.677	108.817
33	52	Stewart Friesen	Halmar Friesen Racing	Toyota	20.729	108.544
34	02	Kris Wright	Young's Motorsports	Chevrolet	20.921	107.547
35	12	Spencer Boyd	Young's Motorsports	Chevrolet	20.952	107.388
36	38	Zane Smith	Front Row Motorsports	Ford	–	–
Failed to qualify
37	75	Parker Kligerman (i)	Henderson Motorsports	Chevrolet	20.818	108.080
38	33	Josh Reaume	Reaume Brothers Racing	Ford	20.839	107.971
39	6	Norm Benning	Norm Benning Racing	Chevrolet	21.923	102.632
Withdrew
40	46	Akinori Ogata	G2G Racing	Toyota	–	–
Official qualifying results
Official starting lineup

== Race results ==
Stage 1 Laps: 70

Pos.	#	Driver	Team	Make	Pts
1	11	Corey Heim	Tricon Garage	Toyota	10
2	51	William Byron (i)	Kyle Busch Motorsports	Chevrolet	0
3	61	Christopher Bell (i)	Hattori Racing Enterprises	Toyota	0
4	9	Colby Howard	CR7 Motorsports	Chevrolet	7
5	42	Carson Hocevar	Niece Motorsports	Chevrolet	6
6	52	Stewart Friesen	Halmar Friesen Racing	Toyota	5
7	38	Zane Smith	Front Row Motorsports	Ford	4
8	7	Kyle Larson (i)	Spire Motorsports	Chevrolet	0
9	4	Chase Purdy	Kyle Busch Motorsports	Chevrolet	2
10	16	Tyler Ankrum	Hattori Racing Enterprises	Toyota	1

Stage 2 Laps: 70

Pos.	#	Driver	Team	Make	Pts
1	7	Kyle Larson (i)	Spire Motorsports	Chevrolet	0
2	42	Carson Hocevar	Niece Motorsports	Chevrolet	9
3	38	Zane Smith	Front Row Motorsports	Ford	8
4	11	Corey Heim	Tricon Garage	Toyota	7
5	51	William Byron (i)	Kyle Busch Motorsports	Chevrolet	0
6	25	Matt DiBenedetto	Rackley WAR	Chevrolet	5
7	23	Grant Enfinger	GMS Racing	Chevrolet	4
8	41	Ross Chastain (i)	Niece Motorsports	Chevrolet	0
9	1	Bubba Wallace (i)	Tricon Garage	Toyota	0
10	16	Tyler Ankrum	Hattori Racing Enterprises	Toyota	1

Stage 3 Laps: 112

Fin	St	#	Driver	Team	Make	Laps	Led	Status	Pts
1	8	7	Kyle Larson (i)	Spire Motorsports	Chevrolet	252	138	Running	0
2	3	98	Ty Majeski	ThorSport Racing	Ford	252	0	Running	35
3	15	25	Matt DiBenedetto	Rackley WAR	Chevrolet	252	0	Running	39
4	2	42	Carson Hocevar	Niece Motorsports	Chevrolet	252	16	Running	48
5	14	1	Bubba Wallace (i)	Tricon Garage	Toyota	252	13	Running	0
6	1	11	Corey Heim	Tricon Garage	Toyota	252	75	Running	48
7	18	88	Matt Crafton	ThorSport Racing	Ford	252	0	Running	30
8	24	4	Chase Purdy	Kyle Busch Motorsports	Chevrolet	252	0	Running	31
9	12	41	Ross Chastain (i)	Niece Motorsports	Chevrolet	252	0	Running	0
10	7	23	Grant Enfinger	GMS Racing	Chevrolet	252	0	Running	31
11	4	51	William Byron (i)	Kyle Busch Motorsports	Chevrolet	252	10	Running	0
12	32	30	Chris Hacker	On Point Motorsports	Toyota	252	0	Running	25
13	33	52	Stewart Friesen	Halmar Friesen Racing	Toyota	252	0	Running	29
14	16	43	Daniel Dye (R)	GMS Racing	Chevrolet	252	0	Running	23
15	6	32	Bret Holmes (R)	Bret Holmes Racing	Chevrolet	252	0	Running	22
16	9	61	Christopher Bell (i)	Hattori Racing Enterprises	Toyota	252	0	Running	0
17	11	20	Kaden Honeycutt	Young's Motorsports	Chevrolet	252	0	Running	20
18	31	15	Tanner Gray	Tricon Garage	Toyota	252	0	Running	19
19	22	45	Lawless Alan	Niece Motorsports	Chevrolet	252	0	Running	18
20	10	13	Hailie Deegan	ThorSport Racing	Ford	252	0	Running	17
21	27	17	Taylor Gray (R)	Tricon Garage	Toyota	252	0	Running	16
22	34	02	Kris Wright	Young's Motorsports	Chevrolet	252	0	Running	15
23	21	35	Jake Garcia (R)	McAnally-Hilgemann Racing	Chevrolet	252	0	Running	14
24	5	9	Colby Howard	CR7 Motorsports	Chevrolet	252	0	Running	20
25	13	19	Christian Eckes	McAnally-Hilgemann Racing	Chevrolet	252	0	Running	12
26	17	16	Tyler Ankrum	Hattori Racing Enterprises	Toyota	250	0	Running	13
27	35	12	Spencer Boyd	Young's Motorsports	Chevrolet	250	0	Running	10
28	28	22	Josh Williams (i)	AM Racing	Ford	221	0	Water Pump	0
29	30	66	Conner Jones	ThorSport Racing	Ford	219	0	Electrical	8
30	20	2	Nick Sanchez (R)	Rev Racing	Chevrolet	213	0	Running	7
31	26	56	Timmy Hill	Hill Motorsports	Toyota	211	0	Running	6
32	36	38	Zane Smith	Front Row Motorsports	Ford	204	0	Accident	17
33	19	99	Ben Rhodes	ThorSport Racing	Ford	202	0	Accident	4
34	23	24	Rajah Caruth (R)	GMS Racing	Chevrolet	200	0	Accident	3
35	25	5	Dean Thompson	Tricon Garage	Toyota	182	0	Accident	2
36	29	04	Johnny Sauter	Roper Racing	Ford	153	0	Electrical	1
Official race results

== Standings after the race ==
Drivers' Championship standings

	Pos	Driver	Points
2	1	Corey Heim	371
	2	Ty Majeski	364 (-7)
2	3	Zane Smith	355 (-16)
2	4	Grant Enfinger	330 (-41)
	5	Christian Eckes	311 (-60)
2	6	Ben Rhodes	305 (-66)
	7	Matt Crafton	290 (-81)
	8	Tanner Gray	273 (-98)
1	9	Stewart Friesen	256 (-115)
1	10	Matt DiBenedetto	252 (-119)
Official driver's standings

- Note: Only the first 10 positions are included for the driver standings.

Previous race: 2023 Buckle Up South Carolina 200	NASCAR Craftsman Truck Series; 2023 season	Next race: 2023 North Carolina Education Lottery 200
