= 2023 Toyota 200 =

12th race of the 2023 NASCAR Craftsman Truck Series

2023 Toyota 200 presented by CK Power
Race details
- Race 12 of 23 of the 2023 NASCAR Craftsman Truck Series
- Date: June 3, 2023
- Official name: 10th Annual Toyota 200
- Location: Gateway Motorsports Park, Madison, Illinois
- Course: Permanent racing facility
- Course length: 1.25 miles (2.01 km)
- Distance: 162 laps, 202 mi (325 km)
- Scheduled distance: 160 laps, 200 mi (321 km)
- Average speed: 80.740 mph (129.938 km/h)

Pole position
Driver	Ty Majeski	ThorSport Racing
- Time: 32.569

Most laps led
Driver	Grant Enfinger	GMS Racing
- Laps: 65

Winner
No. 23	Grant Enfinger	GMS Racing

Television in the United States
- Network: FS1
- Announcers: Jamie Little, Phil Parsons, and Michael Waltrip

Radio in the United States
- Radio: MRN

The 2023 Toyota 200 presented by CK Power was the 12th stock car race of the 2023 NASCAR Craftsman Truck Series, and the 10th iteration of the event. The race was held on Saturday, June 3, 2023, in Madison, Illinois at Gateway Motorsports Park, a 1.25 miles (2.01 km) permanent quad-oval shaped racetrack. The race was increased from 160 to 162 laps, due to a NASCAR overtime finish. Grant Enfinger, driving for GMS Racing, would take advantage of the lead on the final restart with two laps to go, and earned his ninth career NASCAR Craftsman Truck Series win, and his second of the season. Enfinger and Ty Majeski both dominated the entire race, leading 65 and 55 laps. To fill out the podium, Christian Eckes, driving for McAnally-Hilgemann Racing, and Stewart Friesen, driving for Halmar Friesen Racing, would finish 2nd and 3rd, respectively.

== Background ==
World Wide Technology Raceway (formerly Gateway International Raceway and Gateway Motorsports Park) is a motorsport racing facility in Madison, Illinois, just east of St. Louis, Missouri, United States, close to the Gateway Arch. It features a 1.25-mile (2 kilometer) oval that hosts the NASCAR Cup Series, NASCAR Craftsman Truck Series, and the NTT IndyCar Series, a 1.6-mile (2.6 km) infield road course used by the SCCA, Porsche Club of America, and various car clubs, and a quarter-mile drag strip that hosts the annual NHRA Midwest Nationals event.

=== Entry list ===
- (R) denotes rookie driver.

#	Driver	Team	Make
1	Toni Breidinger	Tricon Garage	Toyota
02	Chris Hacker	Young's Motorsports	Chevrolet
2	Nick Sanchez (R)	Rev Racing	Chevrolet
4	Chase Purdy	Kyle Busch Motorsports	Chevrolet
5	Dean Thompson	Tricon Garage	Toyota
6	Norm Benning	Norm Benning Racing	Chevrolet
9	Colby Howard	CR7 Motorsports	Chevrolet
11	Jesse Love	Tricon Garage	Toyota
12	Spencer Boyd	Young's Motorsports	Chevrolet
13	Hailie Deegan	ThorSport Racing	Ford
15	Tanner Gray	Tricon Garage	Toyota
16	Tyler Ankrum	Hattori Racing Enterprises	Toyota
17	Taylor Gray (R)	Tricon Garage	Toyota
19	Christian Eckes	McAnally-Hilgemann Racing	Chevrolet
20	Matt Mills	Young's Motorsports	Chevrolet
23	Grant Enfinger	GMS Racing	Chevrolet
24	Rajah Caruth (R)	GMS Racing	Chevrolet
25	Matt DiBenedetto	Rackley WAR	Chevrolet
32	Bret Holmes (R)	Bret Holmes Racing	Chevrolet
33	Josh Reaume	Reaume Brothers Racing	Ford
34	Stephen Mallozzi	Reaume Brothers Racing	Ford
35	Jake Garcia (R)	McAnally-Hilgemann Racing	Chevrolet
38	Zane Smith	Front Row Motorsports	Ford
41	Bayley Currey	Niece Motorsports	Chevrolet
42	Carson Hocevar	Niece Motorsports	Chevrolet
43	Daniel Dye (R)	GMS Racing	Chevrolet
45	Lawless Alan	Niece Motorsports	Chevrolet
51	Jack Wood	Kyle Busch Motorsports	Chevrolet
52	Stewart Friesen	Halmar Friesen Racing	Toyota
56	Timmy Hill	Hill Motorsports	Toyota
66	Conner Jones	ThorSport Racing	Ford
88	Matt Crafton	ThorSport Racing	Ford
95	Clay Greenfield	GK Racing	Toyota
98	Ty Majeski	ThorSport Racing	Ford
99	Ben Rhodes	ThorSport Racing	Ford
Official entry list

== Practice ==
The first and only practice session was held on Friday, June 2, at 5:00 PM CST, and would last for 20 minutes. Ty Majeski, driving for ThorSport Racing, would set the fastest time in the session, with a lap of 33.466, and an average speed of 134.465 mph (216.400 km/h).

Pos.	#	Driver	Team	Make	Time	Speed
1	98	Ty Majeski	ThorSport Racing	Ford	33.466	134.465
2	19	Christian Eckes	McAnally-Hilgemann Racing	Chevrolet	33.590	133.968
3	99	Ben Rhodes	ThorSport Racing	Ford	33.686	133.587
Full practice results

== Qualifying ==
Qualifying was held on Friday, June 2, at 5:30 PM CST. Since Gateway Motorsports Park is a quad-oval racetrack, the qualifying system used is a single-car, one-lap system with only one round. In that round, whoever sets the fastest time will win the pole. Ty Majeski, driving for ThorSport Racing, would score the pole for the race, with a lap of 32.569, and an average speed of 138.168 mph (222.360 km/h).

Pos.	#	Driver	Team	Make	Time	Speed
1	98	Ty Majeski	ThorSport Racing	Ford	32.569	138.168
2	99	Ben Rhodes	ThorSport Racing	Ford	32.663	137.771
3	19	Christian Eckes	McAnally-Hilgemann Racing	Chevrolet	32.676	137.716
4	42	Carson Hocevar	Niece Motorsports	Chevrolet	32.833	137.057
5	52	Stewart Friesen	Halmar Friesen Racing	Toyota	32.845	137.007
6	38	Zane Smith	Front Row Motorsports	Ford	32.865	136.924
7	35	Jake Garcia (R)	McAnally-Hilgemann Racing	Chevrolet	32.872	136.895
8	4	Chase Purdy	Kyle Busch Motorsports	Chevrolet	32.942	136.604
9	2	Nick Sanchez (R)	Rev Racing	Chevrolet	32.962	136.521
10	23	Grant Enfinger	GMS Racing	Chevrolet	32.976	136.463
11	41	Bayley Currey	Niece Motorsports	Chevrolet	33.008	136.331
12	16	Tyler Ankrum	Hattori Racing Enterprises	Toyota	33.051	136.153
13	17	Taylor Gray (R)	Tricon Garage	Toyota	33.094	135.976
14	15	Tanner Gray	Tricon Garage	Toyota	33.097	135.964
15	25	Matt DiBenedetto	Rackley WAR	Chevrolet	33.152	135.738
16	5	Dean Thompson	Tricon Garage	Toyota	33.183	135.612
17	43	Daniel Dye (R)	GMS Racing	Chevrolet	33.185	135.603
18	1	Toni Breidinger	Tricon Garage	Toyota	33.309	135.099
19	13	Hailie Deegan	ThorSport Racing	Ford	33.317	135.066
20	11	Jesse Love	Tricon Garage	Toyota	33.336	134.989
21	51	Jack Wood	Kyle Busch Motorsports	Chevrolet	33.561	134.084
22	9	Colby Howard	CR7 Motorsports	Chevrolet	33.594	133.952
23	45	Lawless Alan	Niece Motorsports	Chevrolet	33.743	133.361
24	66	Conner Jones	ThorSport Racing	Ford	33.781	133.211
25	32	Bret Holmes (R)	Bret Holmes Racing	Chevrolet	33.785	133.195
26	02	Chris Hacker	Young's Motorsports	Chevrolet	34.231	131.460
27	56	Timmy Hill	Hill Motorsports	Toyota	34.461	130.582
28	12	Spencer Boyd	Young's Motorsports	Chevrolet	34.703	129.672
29	20	Matt Mills	Young's Motorsports	Chevrolet	34.959	128.722
30	34	Stephen Mallozzi	Reaume Brothers Racing	Ford	34.972	128.674
31	95	Clay Greenfield	GK Racing	Toyota	35.386	127.169
Qualified by owner's points
32	33	Josh Reaume	Reaume Brothers Racing	Ford	36.067	124.768
33	6	Norm Benning	Norm Benning Racing	Chevrolet	37.984	118.471
34	88	Matt Crafton	ThorSport Racing	Ford	–	–
35	24	Rajah Caruth (R)	GMS Racing	Chevrolet	–	–
Withdrew
36	30	Chris Hacker	On Point Motorsports	Toyota	–	–
37	46	Memphis Villareal	G2G Racing	Toyota	–	–
38	22	Josh Reaume	AM Racing	Ford	–	–
Official qualifying results
Official starting lineup

== Race results ==
Stage 1 Laps: 55

Pos.	#	Driver	Team	Make	Pts
1	23	Grant Enfinger	GMS Racing	Chevrolet	10
2	98	Ty Majeski	ThorSport Racing	Ford	9
3	99	Ben Rhodes	ThorSport Racing	Ford	8
4	38	Zane Smith	Front Row Motorsports	Ford	7
5	25	Matt DiBenedetto	Rackley WAR	Chevrolet	6
6	15	Tanner Gray	Tricon Garage	Toyota	5
7	19	Christian Eckes	McAnally-Hilgemann Racing	Chevrolet	4
8	4	Chase Purdy	Kyle Busch Motorsports	Chevrolet	3
9	42	Carson Hocevar	Niece Motorsports	Chevrolet	2
10	52	Stewart Friesen	Halmar Friesen Racing	Toyota	1

Stage 2 Laps: 55

Pos.	#	Driver	Team	Make	Pts
1	52	Stewart Friesen	Halmar Friesen Racing	Toyota	10
2	98	Ty Majeski	ThorSport Racing	Ford	9
3	2	Nick Sanchez (R)	Rev Racing	Chevrolet	8
4	19	Christian Eckes	McAnally-Hilgemann Racing	Chevrolet	7
5	99	Ben Rhodes	ThorSport Racing	Ford	6
6	88	Matt Crafton	ThorSport Racing	Ford	5
7	23	Grant Enfinger	GMS Racing	Chevrolet	4
8	15	Tanner Gray	Tricon Garage	Toyota	3
9	43	Daniel Dye (R)	GMS Racing	Chevrolet	2
10	17	Taylor Gray (R)	Tricon Garage	Toyota	1

Stage 3 Laps: 52

Fin	St	#	Driver	Team	Make	Laps	Led	Status	Pts
1	10	23	Grant Enfinger	GMS Racing	Chevrolet	162	65	Running	54
2	3	19	Christian Eckes	McAnally-Hilgemann Racing	Chevrolet	162	0	Running	46
3	5	52	Stewart Friesen	Halmar Friesen Racing	Toyota	162	10	Running	45
4	4	42	Carson Hocevar	Niece Motorsports	Chevrolet	162	0	Running	35
5	8	4	Chase Purdy	Kyle Busch Motorsports	Chevrolet	162	0	Running	35
6	15	25	Matt DiBenedetto	Rackley WAR	Chevrolet	162	0	Running	37
7	2	99	Ben Rhodes	ThorSport Racing	Ford	162	0	Running	44
8	9	2	Nick Sanchez (R)	Rev Racing	Chevrolet	162	0	Running	37
9	20	11	Jesse Love	Tricon Garage	Toyota	162	0	Running	28
10	7	35	Jake Garcia (R)	McAnally-Hilgemann Racing	Chevrolet	162	0	Running	27
11	17	43	Daniel Dye (R)	GMS Racing	Chevrolet	162	0	Running	28
12	22	9	Colby Howard	CR7 Motorsports	Chevrolet	162	0	Running	25
13	13	17	Taylor Gray (R)	Tricon Garage	Toyota	162	0	Running	25
14	25	32	Bret Holmes (R)	Bret Holmes Racing	Chevrolet	162	0	Running	23
15	35	24	Rajah Caruth (R)	GMS Racing	Chevrolet	162	0	Running	22
16	12	16	Tyler Ankrum	Hattori Racing Enterprises	Toyota	162	0	Running	21
17	11	41	Bayley Currey	Niece Motorsports	Chevrolet	162	0	Running	20
18	27	56	Timmy Hill	Hill Motorsports	Toyota	162	0	Running	19
19	29	20	Matt Mills	Young's Motorsports	Chevrolet	162	0	Running	18
20	6	38	Zane Smith	Front Row Motorsports	Ford	162	32	Running	24
21	14	15	Tanner Gray	Tricon Garage	Toyota	162	0	Running	24
22	23	45	Lawless Alan	Niece Motorsports	Chevrolet	162	0	Running	15
23	32	33	Josh Reaume	Reaume Brothers Racing	Ford	161	0	Running	14
24	18	1	Toni Breidinger	Tricon Garage	Toyota	161	0	Running	13
25	34	88	Matt Crafton	ThorSport Racing	Ford	160	0	Running	17
26	28	12	Spencer Boyd	Young's Motorsports	Chevrolet	160	0	Running	11
27	26	02	Chris Hacker	Young's Motorsports	Chevrolet	159	0	Running	10
28	33	6	Norm Benning	Norm Benning Racing	Chevrolet	159	0	Running	9
29	21	51	Jack Wood	Kyle Busch Motorsports	Chevrolet	158	0	Running	8
30	1	98	Ty Majeski	ThorSport Racing	Ford	155	55	Accident	25
31	30	34	Stephen Mallozzi	Reaume Brothers Racing	Ford	146	0	Running	6
32	19	13	Hailie Deegan	ThorSport Racing	Ford	86	0	Accident	5
33	24	66	Conner Jones	ThorSport Racing	Ford	66	0	Accident	4
34	16	5	Dean Thompson	Tricon Garage	Toyota	20	0	Engine	3
35	31	95	Clay Greenfield	GK Racing	Toyota	0	0	Accident	2
Official race results

== Standings after the race ==
Drivers' Championship standings

	Pos	Driver	Points
	1	Corey Heim	425
	2	Ty Majeski	424 (-1)
1	3	Grant Enfinger	416 (-9)
1	4	Zane Smith	406 (-19)
	5	Ben Rhodes	393 (-32)
	6	Christian Eckes	389 (-36)
1	7	Carson Hocevar	337 (-88)
1	8	Matt Crafton	332 (-93)
2	9	Stewart Friesen	325 (-100)
	10	Matt DiBenedetto	318 (-107)
Official driver's standings

- Note: Only the first 10 positions are included for the driver standings.

Previous race: 2023 North Carolina Education Lottery 200	NASCAR Craftsman Truck Series; 2023 season	Next race: 2023 Rackley Roofing 200
