= Ty Majeski =

American racing driver (born 1994)

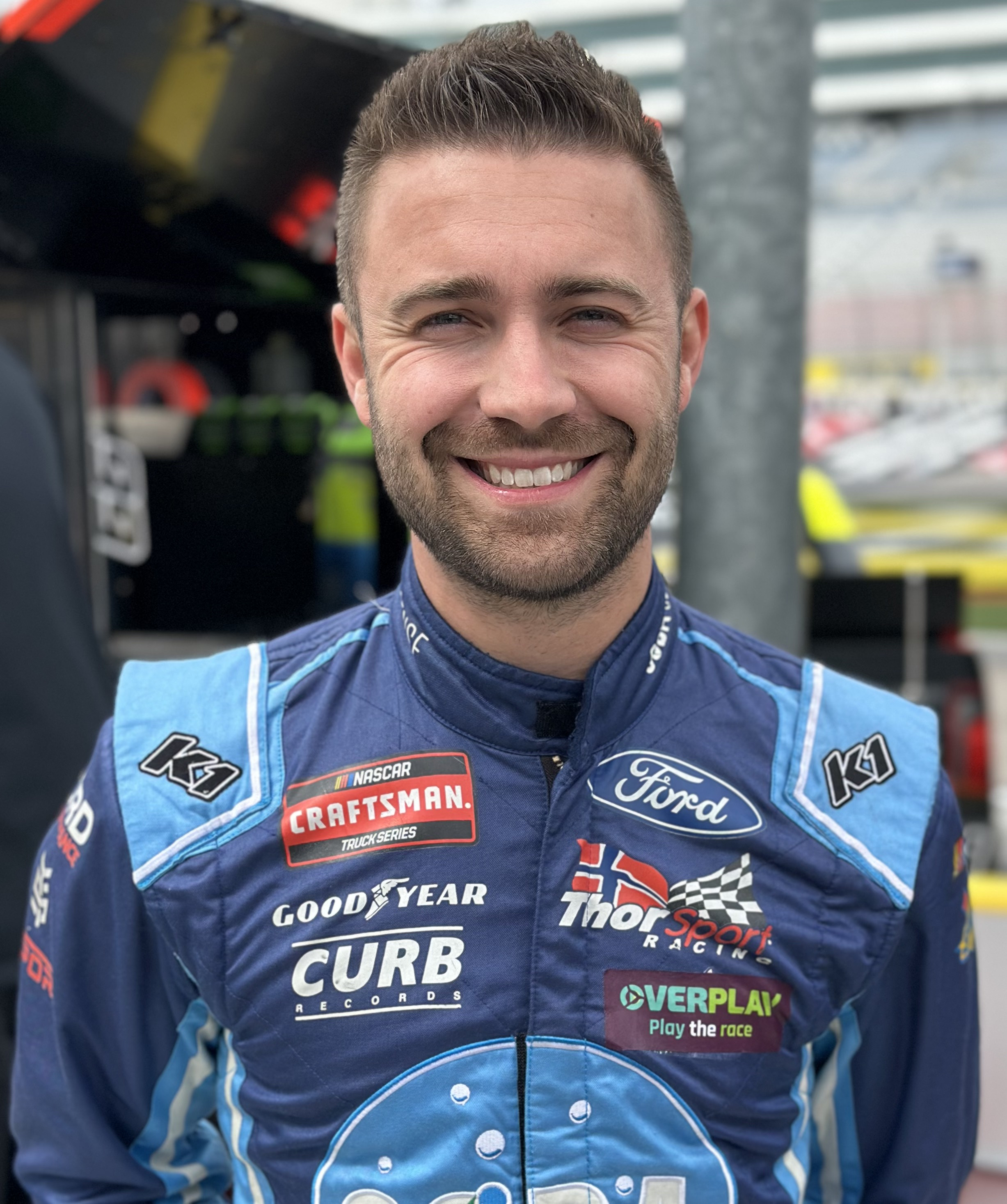
- Majeski at Las Vegas Motor Speedway in 2025
- Born: Tyler Brad Majeski; August 18, 1994 (age 32); Seymour, Wisconsin, U.S.
- Achievements: 2024 NASCAR Craftsman Truck Series Champion; 2014, 2015, 2016, 2017, 2021 ARCA Midwest Tour Champion; 2023 ASA Stars National Tour Champion; 2016 World Series of Asphalt Super Late Model Champion; 2020, 2023 Snowball Derby Winner; 2026 Money in the Bank 150 Winner; 2020, 2021 South Carolina 400 Winner; 2025 Winchester 400 Winner; 2016, 2019, 2020, 2024, 2025 Oktoberfest Winner; 2018, 2020, 2023, 2025 Slinger Nationals Winner; 2015, 2016, 2017 Florida Governor's Cup Winner; 2016, 2017, 2020, 2021, 2022, 2026 Rattler 250 Winner; 2015, 2019 Howie Lettow Memorial Winner; 2019, 2020, 2022, 2023, 2024 Gandrud Auto Group 250 Winner; 2017, 2018 Dells Icebreaker Winner; 2020 Orange Blossom 100 Winner; 2019 Winter Showdown Winner; 2015, 2021, 2022, 2023 Dick Trickle 99 winner
- Awards: 2014 ARCA Midwest Tour Rookie of the Year; Holds record for most ARCA Midwest Tour Championships (5)

NASCAR O'Reilly Auto Parts Series career
- 15 races run over 2 years
- 2018 position: 34th
- Best finish: 34th (2018)
- First race: 2017 American Ethanol E15 250 (Iowa)
- Last race: 2018 Whelen Trusted to Perform 200 (Phoenix)
Wins	Top tens	Poles
0	3	0

NASCAR FedEx Freight Truck Series career
- 139 races run over 8 years
- Truck no., team: No. 88 (ThorSport Racing)
- 2026 position: 4th
- Best finish: 1st (2024)
- First race: 2019 Lucas Oil 150 (Phoenix)
- Last race: 2026 Craftsman 200 (Homestead)
- First win: 2022 UNOH 200 (Bristol)
- Last win: 2024 NASCAR Craftsman Truck Series Championship Race (Phoenix)
Wins	Top tens	Poles
6	79	14

ARCA Menards Series career
- 15 races run over 3 years
- Best finish: 20th (2019)
- First race: 2016 Montgomery Ward Fathers Day 200 (Madison)
- Last race: 2019 Kansas ARCA 150 (Kansas)
- First win: 2019 General Tire 150 (Charlotte)
- Last win: 2019 Bounty 150 (Chicagoland)
Wins	Top tens	Poles
3	13	0

ARCA Menards Series West career
- 1 race run over 1 year
- Best finish: 60th (2019)
- First race: 2019 Arizona Lottery 100 (Phoenix)
Wins	Top tens	Poles
0	0	0
- Statistics up to date as of November 6, 2026.

Tyler Brad Majeski (born August 18, 1994) is an American professional stock car racing driver. He competes full-time in the NASCAR Craftsman Truck Series, driving the No. 88 Ford F-150 for ThorSport Racing, as well as in late model racing. He has also competed in the NASCAR Xfinity Series, ARCA Menards Series, and ARCA Menards Series West in the past. He is the 2024 NASCAR Craftsman Truck Series champion.

Majeski is a member of the 2016 NASCAR Next class and was previously a development driver for Roush Fenway Racing. He raced in three NASCAR Xfinity Series races for the team in 2017 and twelve in 2018, all of which came in their No. 60 car. Majeski was left without a ride when Roush closed down their Xfinity team after the season. He then returned to ARCA in 2019 to drive part-time for Chad Bryant Racing, winning three races in six starts, which landed him a full-time ride in the Truck Series with Niece Motorsports in 2020, which he would be released from during the season, after which he landed at ThorSport in 2021, running a part-time schedule that season, and would then run full time from the 2022 season, winning two races in that season and going on to win a championship two years later.

Majeski is one of the best short track late model racers ever, winning four of his five championships in the ARCA Midwest Tour consecutively (2014-2017, 2021), four editions of the Slinger Nationals, five victories in Oktoberfest, an ASA STARS National Tour championship, and two runnings of the Snowball Derby, among many other accomplishments.

== Racing career ==
=== Early years ===
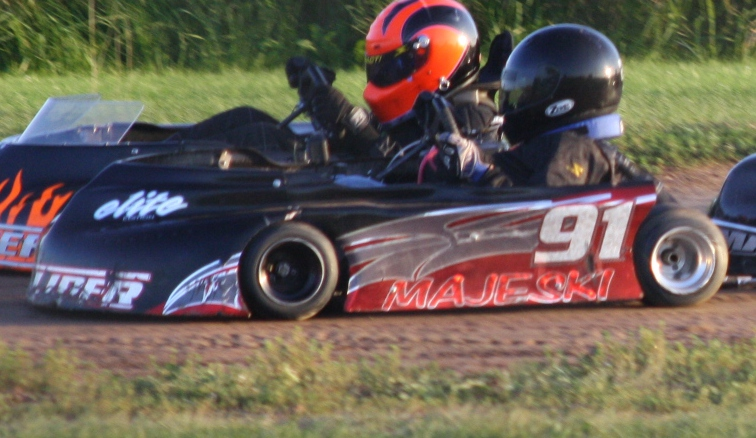
Majeski's 2010 kart at Meadowview Kartway

Majeski was born on August 18, 1994, and began racing as a nine-year-old on dirt karts in 2004 at Hi-Go Raceway near his hometown of Seymour, Wisconsin. Majeski's first win came on his tenth birthday. In his first eight races, he had won three features. He eventually was racing at several different tracks in his home area: GSR Kartway near Clintonville, Wisconsin, Hi-Go Raceway in Cecil, Wisconsin and Meadowview Kartway by Hilbert, Wisconsin. Between 2005 and 2009, he won five track titles and 84 features. By the time he turned 15, he had won a national championship in the Mid-American National Series. In karting, he had won six national championships, three state championships, and five track titles. In 2009, Majeski took second overall in the National Indoor Championship at Batesville, Mississippi; he won three of five events which caught the attention of Bobby Waltrip, the brother of Darrell and Michael Waltrip. In 2009, Waltrip arranged for Majeski to test an asphalt late model race car at Hickory Motor Speedway. After Majeski got used to driving the car, he was posting lap times quicker that the car's normal driver; Waltrip wanted Majeski to move to North Carolina for the 2009 racing season but his family did not want to move.

Majeski ended up remaining in Wisconsin and started racing limited late models in Wisconsin at Pathfinder Racing Chassis / JJ Motorsports Racing as a teammate to Ross Kenseth. He raced a various tracks for the 2010 season including Columbus 151 Speedway, Dells Raceway Park, and Madison International Speedway with former NASCAR Busch Series driver Jason Schuler as his crew chief. Majeski joined the Big 8 Late Model Series tour in 2011. He won three races, including the Big 8 race at the National Short Track Championship weekend at Rockford Speedway.

=== ARCA/Late Models/K&N Pro ===
Majeski progressed to racing Super Late Models in 2012. In 2013, he raced 27 events in four cars for four different owners. In the season, Majeski recorded his first ARCA Midwest Tour pole position at Marshfield Motor Speedway. He won three races at the Oktoberfest race weekend at the LaCrosse Fairgrounds Speedway.

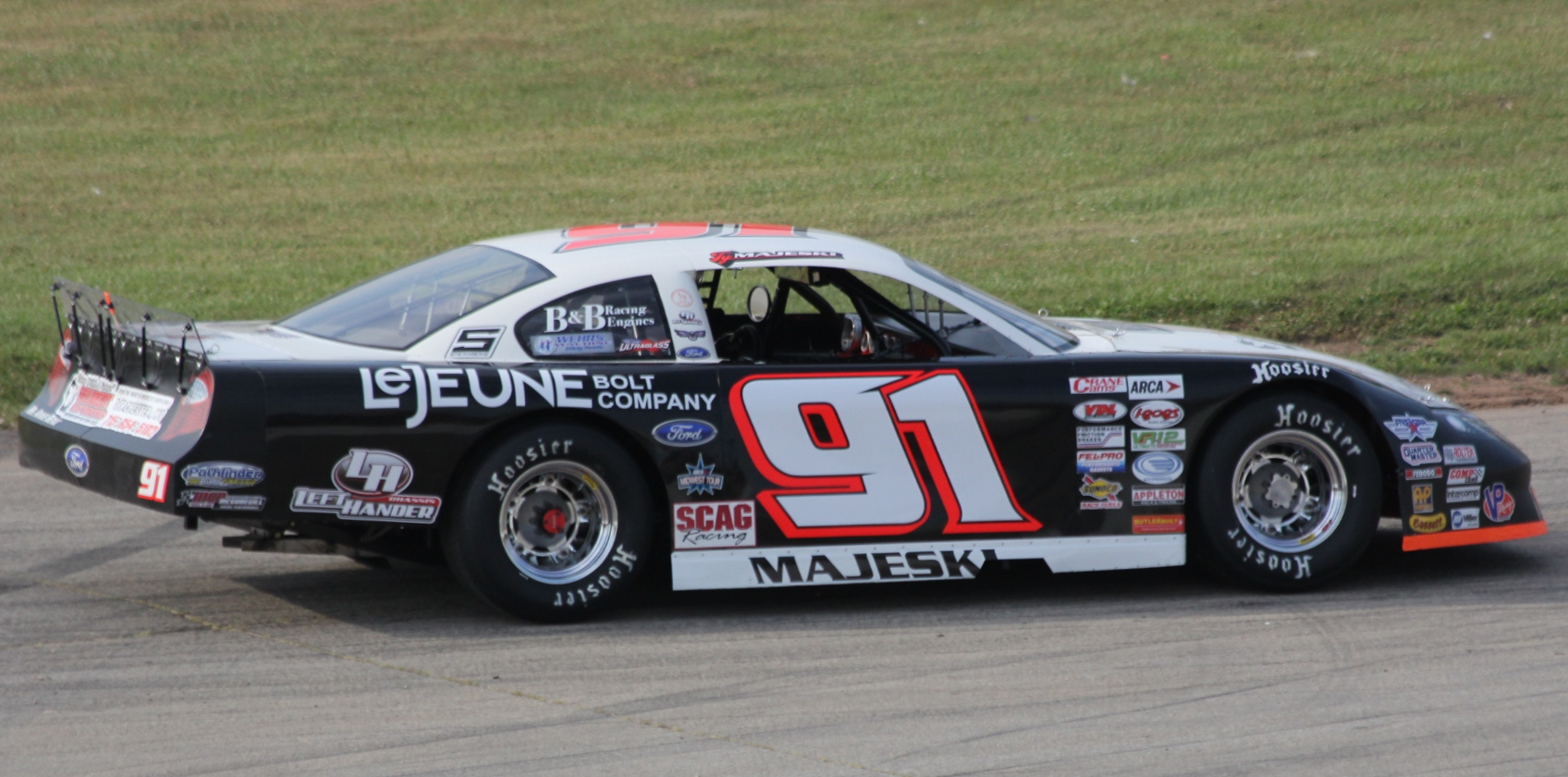
2014 ARCA Midwest Tour car

Majeski raced for the ARCA Midwest Tour Rookie of the Year title in 2014. He achieved his first tour victory at Illiana Motor Speedway in May 2014. That season, he also ran occasional selected weekly races at State Park Speedway on Thursdays, and LaCrosse Fairgrounds Speedway on Saturday nights, TUNDRA Super Late Model Series events, and the three Red, White, and Blue series races at Wisconsin International Raceway. Majeski also won at Hawkeye Downs Speedway in July 2014. He was awarded the series' the Rookie of the Year title along with the ARCA Midwest Tour championship in 2014, becoming the series' youngest champion. At the 2014 Snowball Derby, Majeski started 32nd and moved his way up to a 19th-place finish. He had a total of five victories in 35 races that year.

Majeski was named one of the seven finalists for the inaugural Kulwicki Driver Development Program in 2015. Participants were awarded $7777 to help develop their careers. He raced a similar schedule in 2015, starting with a seven-night series at New Smyrna Speedway for the World Series of Asphalt Stock Car Racing. Majeski won the second program on Tuesday night and led the series points for two nights. In July 2015, Speed51.com ranked him No. 4 on their short track power ranking with seven victories. At the Slinger Nationals, Majeski started 20th and passed up to second place. While battling for the lead near the end of the race, he got into an incident while trying to pass a lapped car and restarted at the back of the lead lap cars to finish fourth.

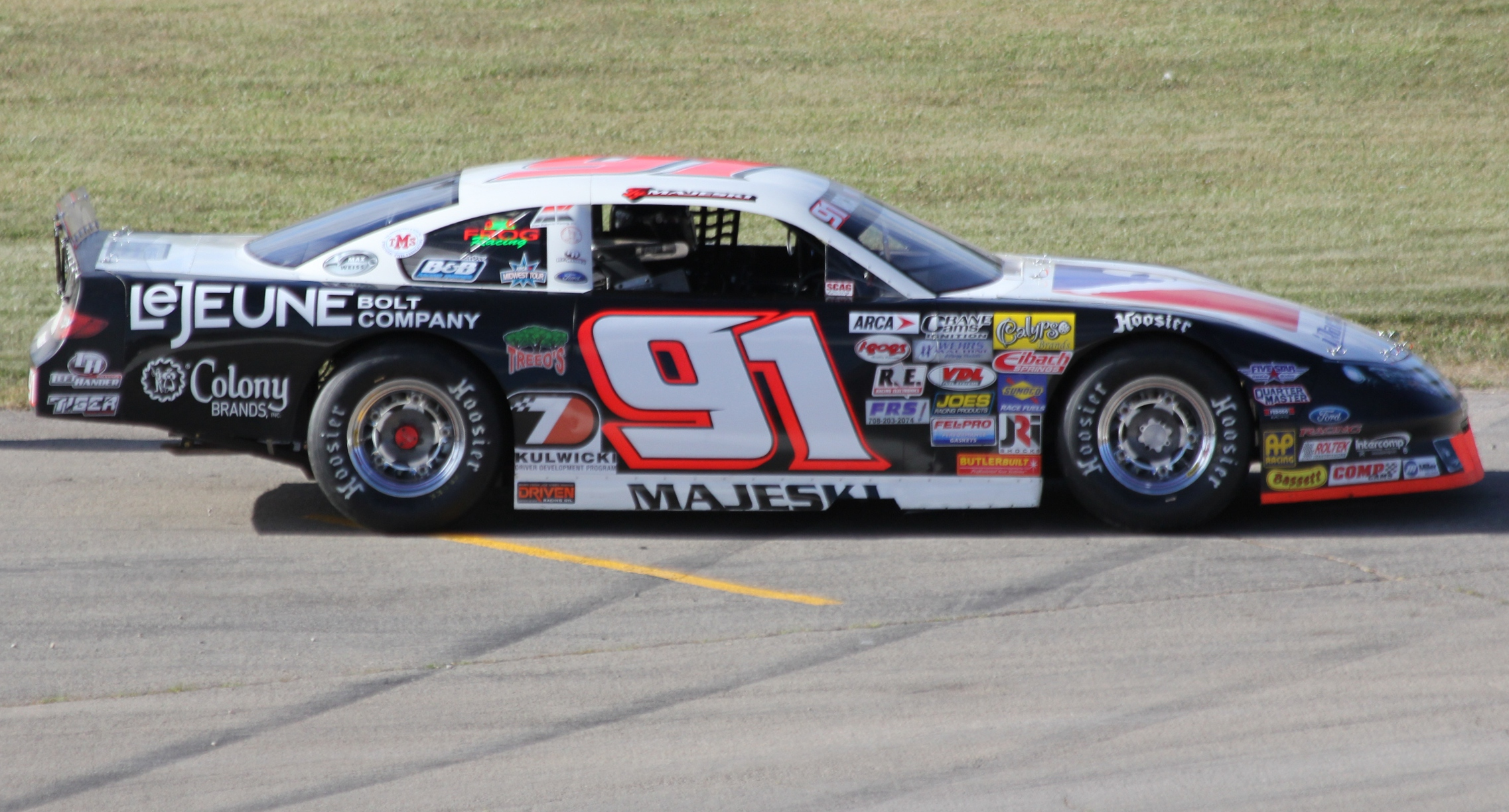
2015 ARCA Midwest Tour car including Kulwicki Driver Development decals

Majeski raced four times during the LaCrosse Oktoberfest weekend; he won the late model feature on Thursday night, the Dick Trickle 99 on Friday night, and the JMcK 63 Big 8 Series race on Saturday night. With 10 laps to go, he was leading the ARCA Midwest Tour race on Sunday when a vapor lock caused his car to temporarily lose power on a restart; he finished third. Majeski traveled across the United States to Florida for the Governor's Cup at New Smyrna Speedway in November. He started 27th. After passing through the entire field, Majeski held off Steven Wallace on numerous restarts to take the win. Dale Earnhardt Jr. tweeted about Majeski's win calling him "the Deal". At the Snowball Derby, Majeski qualified second quickest and was awarded the pole position after Christopher Bell's Kyle Busch Motorsports entry was disqualified.

The Kulwicki Driver Development Program (KDDP) named him their inaugural winner. In 56 events, he had 18 wins, 19 pole positions, and 48 top-ten finishes. Speed51 ranked him No. 3 on their final short track season rankings behind Whelen Modified Tour winner Doug Coby and Lucas Oil Late Model Dirt Series champion Jonathan Davenport. ESPN featured Majeski as the main driver to watch in the future in an off-season article as it described him accepting the KDDP trophy.

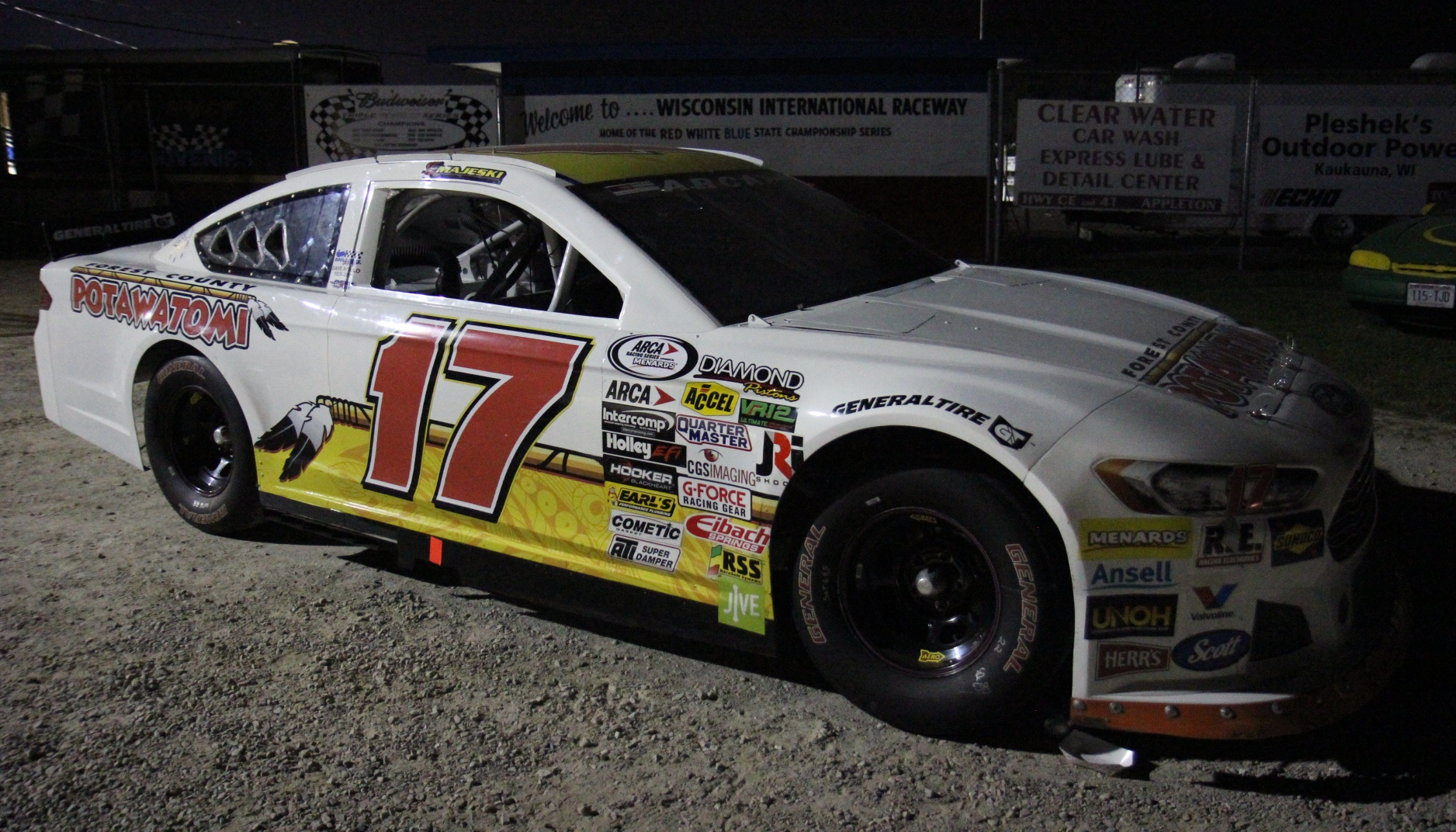
Majeski's 2016 ARCA car

Majeski started the 2016 season in February in the World Series of Asphalt Stock Car Racing at New Smyrna, a week-long series of racing over Speedweeks. Majeski won the second night and the final night to capture three total wins and the Speedweeks title. He finished first or second in all six series events with an average finish of 1.5. He followed the series by racing in another southern race; he quickly went from a seventh place start to the lead as he dominated to win the Rattler 250 race at South Alabama Speedway. Speed51.com rated Majeski as its No. 1 Short Track Draft pick in May 2016. That month, he won the first race of the ARCA Midwest Tour, the Joe Shear Memorial at Madison International Speedway, over Johnny Sauter. In May, he joined Roush Fenway Racing's driver development program. He was one of eleven drivers named to the NASCAR Next 2016–2017 class on the following day. In June 2016, Majeski made his first ARCA start in the No. 17 Roulo Brothers Racing car. He had the fastest time in practice, started seventh, raced up to second, and finished fourth. For the season, Majeski won nine of ten races at LaCrosse, plus had several high finishes at Madison. Majeski noticed that he was high in the NASCAR Whelen All-American Series national points in August despite not intentionally racing for any track's points championship. The driver's top-18 finishes determine their standings. He made a late-season decision to try for the national title. He started double features at Elko Speedway and climbed to tenth in the standings. On the following weekend, he won another feature at Madison for his 13th NASCAR weekly win of the season to climb to third in the standings. He raced more at Elko and Rockford Speedway but finished third in the final points standings.

Majeski ended the season by winning the Oktoberfest main event at LaCrosse to earn his third consecutive ARCA Midwest Tour championship. He returned to New Smyrna Speedway and qualified on the pole position for the Governor's Cup. He fell nearly two laps down during the race and came back to win for the second consecutive year.

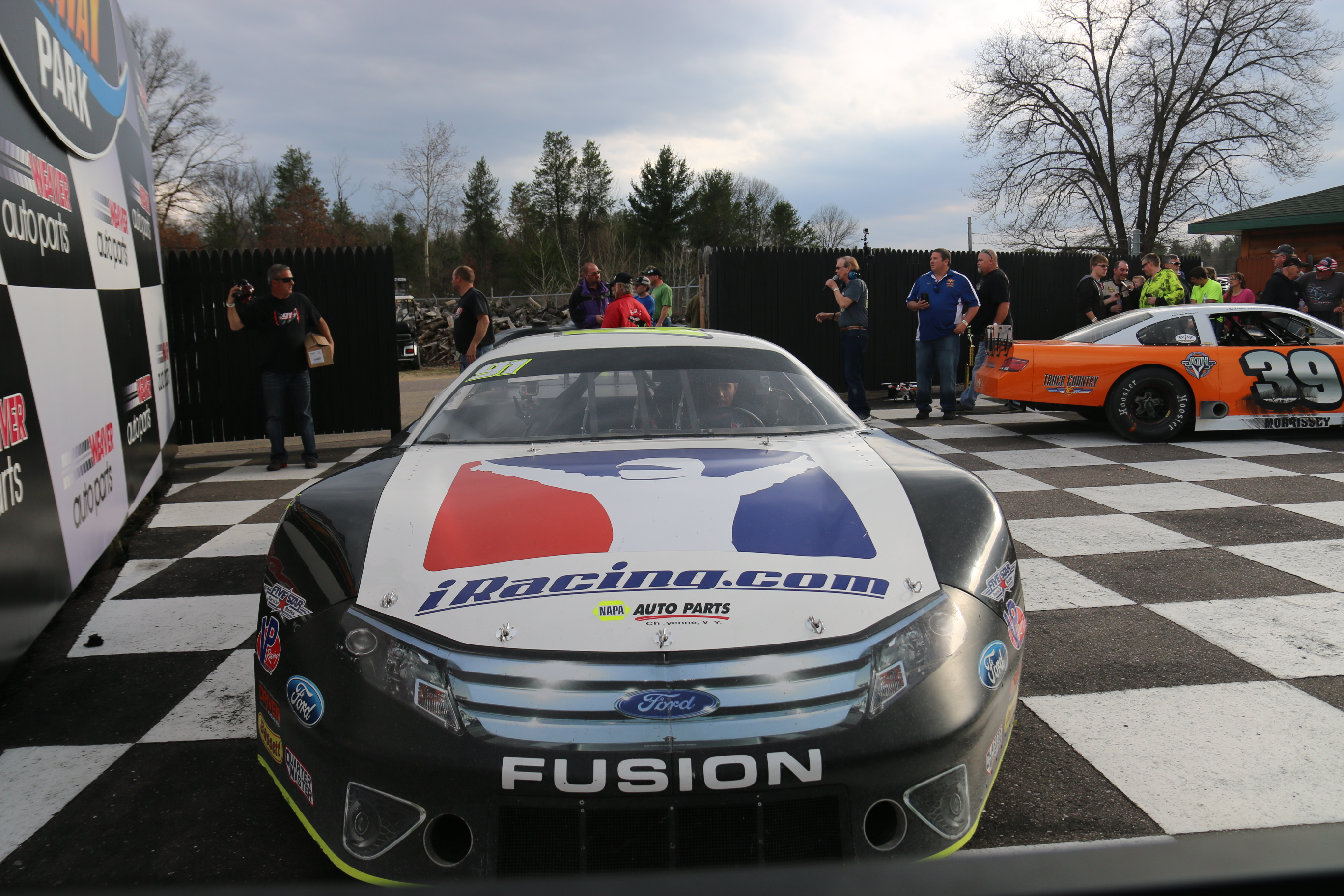
Majeski pulling into victory lane after winning the 2017 Icebreaker 100 at Dells Raceway Park

Majeski moved to Charlotte, North Carolina in early 2017 to work in the Roush organization as an engineer. He reportedly was close to securing a Ford development contract but ARCA champion Chase Briscoe received the contract since he had more large track experience. He began the season racing in the World Series of Asphalt at New Smyrna. Majeski won his second consecutive Rattler 250 over Harrison Burton and Steven Wallace. In March 2017, Majeski announced a part-time schedule in the ARCA series. On April 24, 2017, after testing a car at Daytona International Speedway, it was announced that Majeski would run five ARCA races for Cunningham Motorsports.

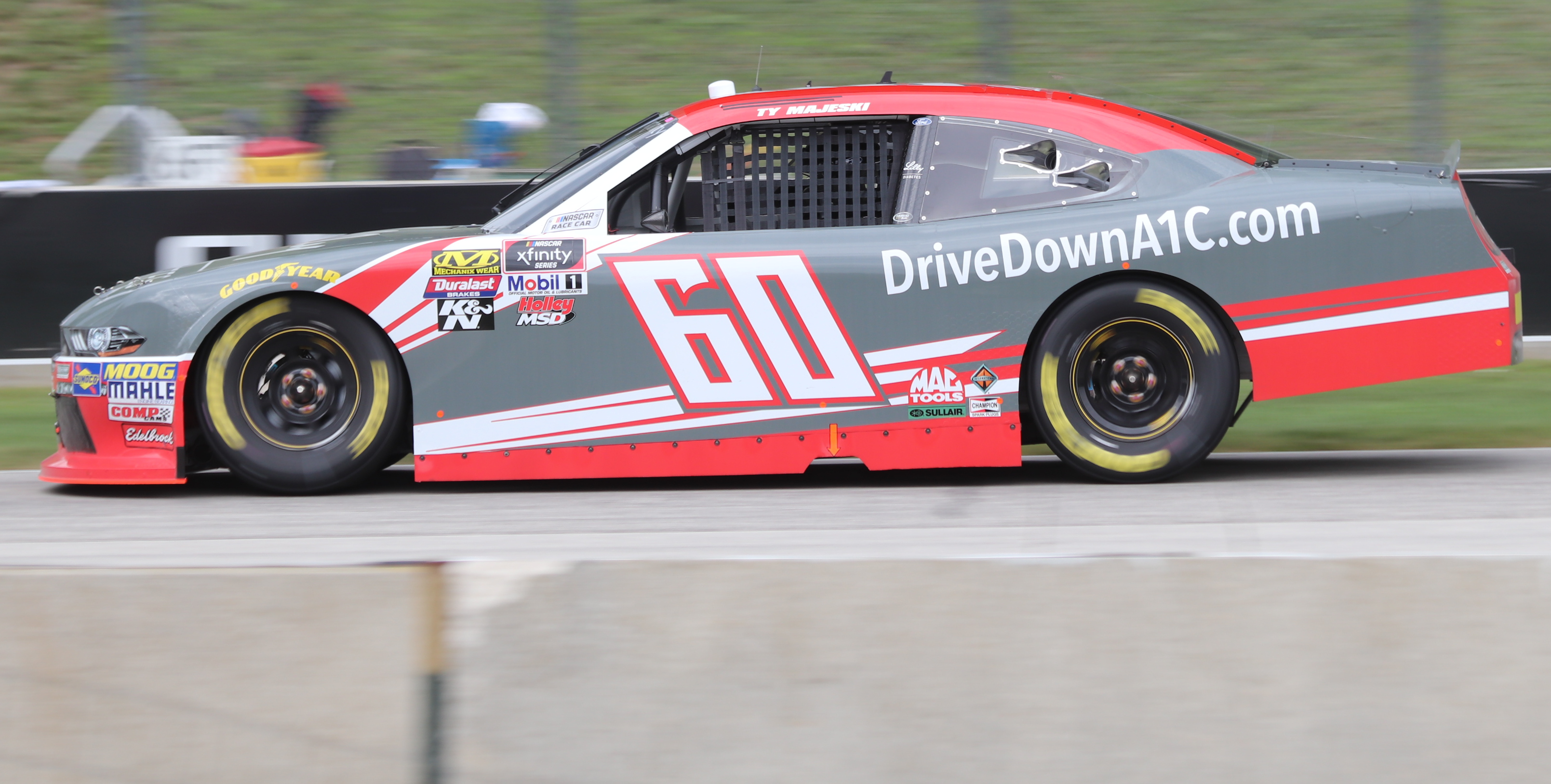
Majeski racing in the 2018 Xfinity Series race at Road America

In April, he returned to Wisconsin for the first asphalt race of the year; he led the last 44 laps to take the Icebreaker 100 win at Dells Raceway Park. Majeski clinched his fourth consecutive ARCA Midwest Tour at Elko Speedway with one race remaining for the season. Majeski won his third consecutive Governor's Cup in a Super Late Model at New Smyrna Speedway in November over Bubba Pollard, Wallace, and Burton.

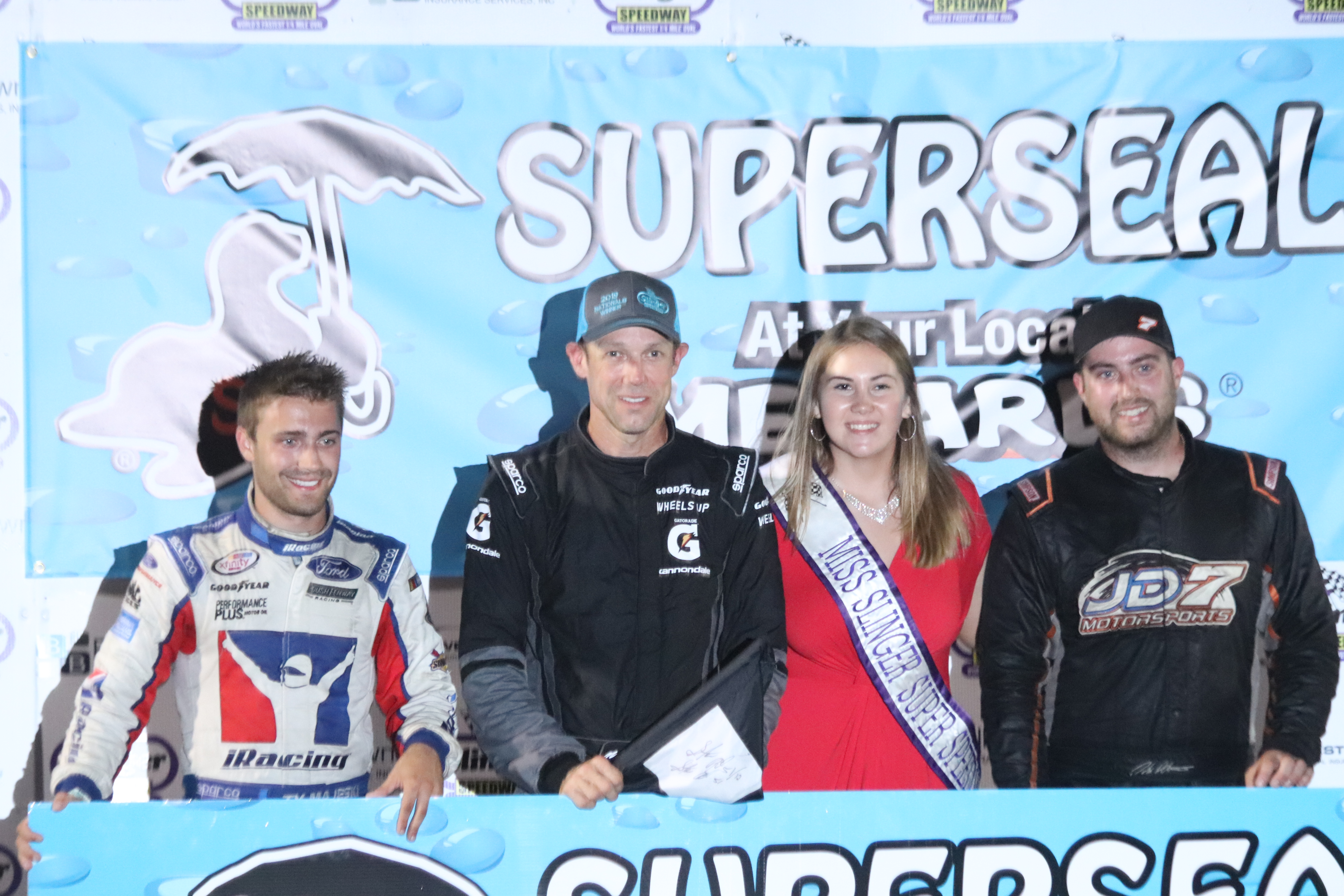
Majeski (left) with Matt Kenseth and John DeAngelis, the 2nd, 1st, and 3rd place finishers in the 2019 Slinger Nationals, following the race

In July 2018, he dominated to win his first Slinger Nationals. On December 2, 2018, Majeski announced a return to Super Late Model racing after it was revealed that Roush Fenway Racing was in the process of closing its Xfinity program. He was announced as the driver for five ARCA races in the No. 22 Chad Bryant Racing car in 2019. In his second start for the team, Majeski took advantage of a late-race mistake by Michael Self to take the lead and held off Sheldon Creed for an overtime win at Charlotte Motor Speedway. He would also win the following race at Pocono Raceway. Going for three in a row at Michigan International Speedway the following week, a fuel gamble fell short on the final corner as Majeski was passed by Michael Self for the win. In July, Majeski was passed in the final corner by Matt Kenseth to finish second in the Slinger Nationals. In August, Majeski scored his first Dixieland 250 win in ARCA Midwest Tour competition at his home track, Wisconsin International Raceway. Majeski pulled away after a restart with 16 laps remaining to capture his second Oktoberfest at LaCrosse in October after a tight battle with Erik Darnell.

During the weekend, he also ran his first NASCAR K&N Pro Series West race at the track with Chad Bryant Racing. On February 16, he won his 100th Super Late Model race during the World Series of Asphalt race at New Smyrna Speedway. In July, Majeski won his second Slinger Nationals after losing some of the power steering just after half-way through the 200 lap event. He won his second consecutive Dixieland 250 ARCA Midwest Tour race at Wisconsin International Raceway in August.

After qualifying on pole position at the Oktoberfest Super Late Model event at LaCrosse in October 2020, he elected to start in the back of the field for a chance to win an extra $6,300 with a victory. He took the ARCA Midwest Tour win over Rich Bickle to pocket the win money and bonus. Majeski then won the Myrtle Beach 400 Late Model race in its first year since moving to Florence Motor Speedway in Timmonsville. Majeski returned to the ARCA Midwest Tour between the NASCAR races and won the 2021 championship with a second-place finish at Oktoberfest. His fifth championship set a new series record. He then repeated his Myrtle Beach 400 win in Florence.

=== Xfinity Series ===
In March 2017, Majeski announced he would be making his NASCAR Xfinity Series debut at Iowa Speedway in June. Two months later, in his Xfinity debut at Iowa, Majeski qualified tenth and ran as high as fifth, but was involved in an accident with Kyle Benjamin on lap 114; he finished 34th. He returned to the Xfinity Series at Iowa and the season finale at Homestead-Miami.

Roush Fenway Racing announced that Majeski would share the No. 60 car with Chase Briscoe and Austin Cindric in 2018. Majeski had his first top-ten result with a seventh-place finish at Iowa.

=== Craftsman Truck Series ===
In November 2019, Majeski made his NASCAR Gander Outdoors Truck Series debut in the Lucas Oil 150 at ISM Raceway, driving the No. 44 truck for Niece Motorsports.

On December 10, 2019, it was announced that Majeski had joined Niece full-time in the team's No. 45 truck for the 2020 NASCAR Gander RV & Outdoors Truck Series season, replacing Ross Chastain. In his first race of the season, he was involved in a crash and slid on his roof in Turn 1 at Daytona.

On September 8, 2020, the entry list for the truck race at Richmond Raceway listed Trevor Bayne as the driver for the No. 45 instead of Majeski, who was nowhere to be found on the entry list. No statement was made as to why Majeski was not entered. Three races later, following a second-place finish at Talladega, Bayne told reporters that he would finish the season in the No. 45, effectively ending Majeski's rookie season without explanation.

In 2021, Majeski joined ThorSport Racing and would return to the Truck Series at Charlotte and Nashville in the No. 66, a part-time fifth truck for them.

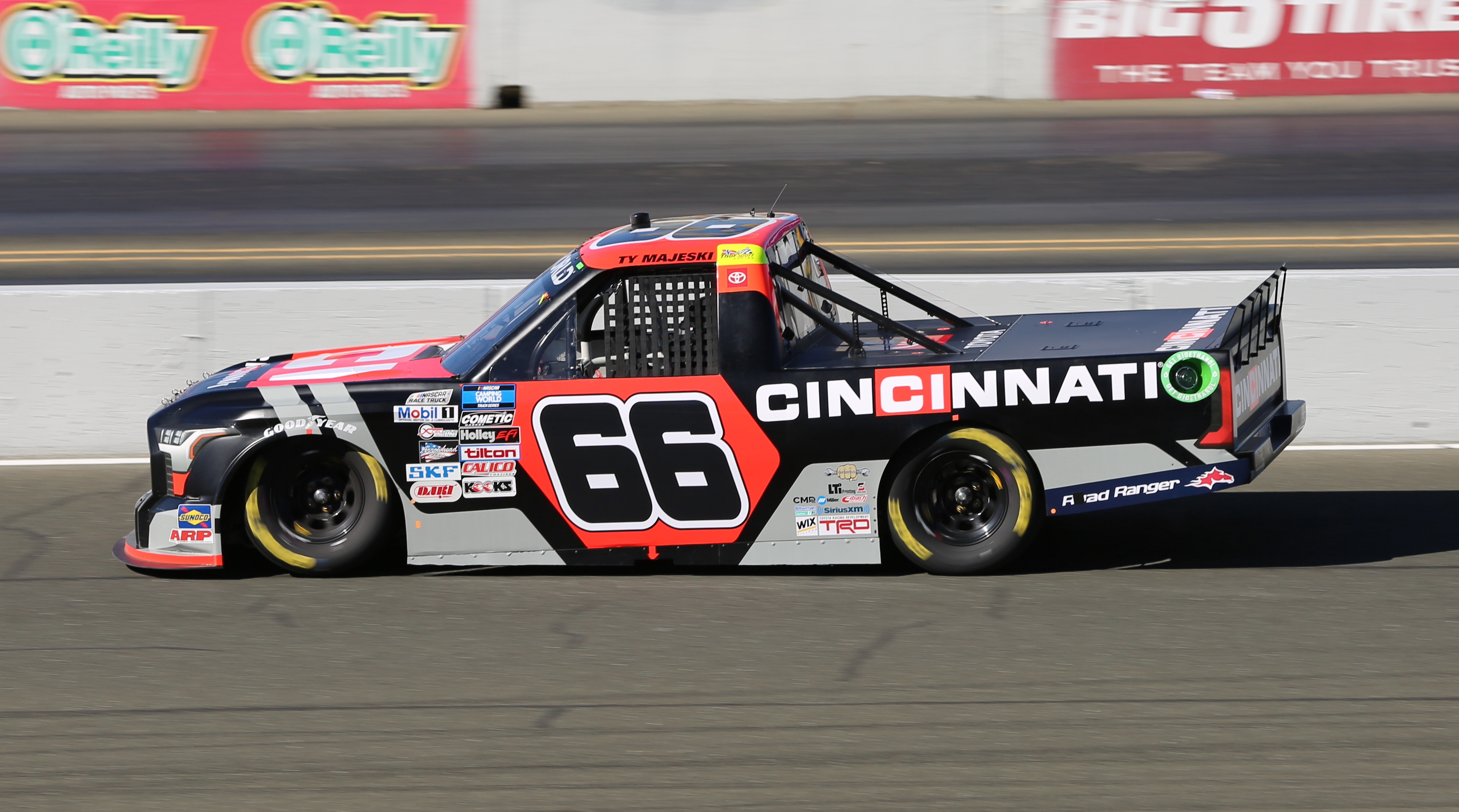
Majeski's No. 66 truck at Sonoma Raceway in 2022

Majeski drove the No. 66 full-time in 2022. He made the playoffs by staying consistent with seven top-fives and ten top-ten finishes. During the playoffs, Majeski won at Bristol and Homestead to lock himself in the Championship 4. He finished 20th at Phoenix after a late spin, resulting in a fourth-place finish in the standings.

Majeski, now driving in the No. 98, started the 2023 season with a sixth-place finish at Daytona. He stayed consistent with seven top-fives and eleven top-ten finishes, allowing him to qualify for the playoffs. Majeski won the first round of the playoffs at Indianapolis. On August 29, NASCAR suspended crew chief Joe Shear Jr. for four races and fined him US$25,000 after the truck was discovered to have an illegal right rear wheel and tire during the inspection prior to the Milwaukee race. In addition, the No. 98 team was docked 75 owner and driver points and five playoff points. Majeski made it all the way to the Round of 8 before he was eliminated at Homestead.

Majeski started the 2024 season with a 15th-place finish at Daytona. Throughout the regular season, he won at Indianapolis and Richmond. Despite not winning during the playoffs, he stayed consistent enough to make the Championship 4. On November 5, NASCAR fined Majeski US$12,500 for skipping championship media day to vote in the 2024 United States presidential election. He scored his third win at Phoenix, winning his first Truck Series championship.

The 2025 season saw Majeski's title defense start off moderately. He remained consistent enough to make the playoffs despite going winless. He nearly won at Richmond, but was involved in a spin with teammate Matt Crafton. Entering the playoffs at Darlington, Majeski was riding a five-race top-ten streak and through the playoffs, Majeski scored a top-ten in every race, making the Championship 4 for the second year in a row and the third time in four seasons. Majeski ended up finishing second at Phoenix (extending his top-ten streak to twelve races) to finish second in the final standings. On August 18, 2025, ThorSport announced that Majeski will move to the No. 88 truck, replacing the retiring Matt Crafton, starting in the 2026 season.

== Personal life ==
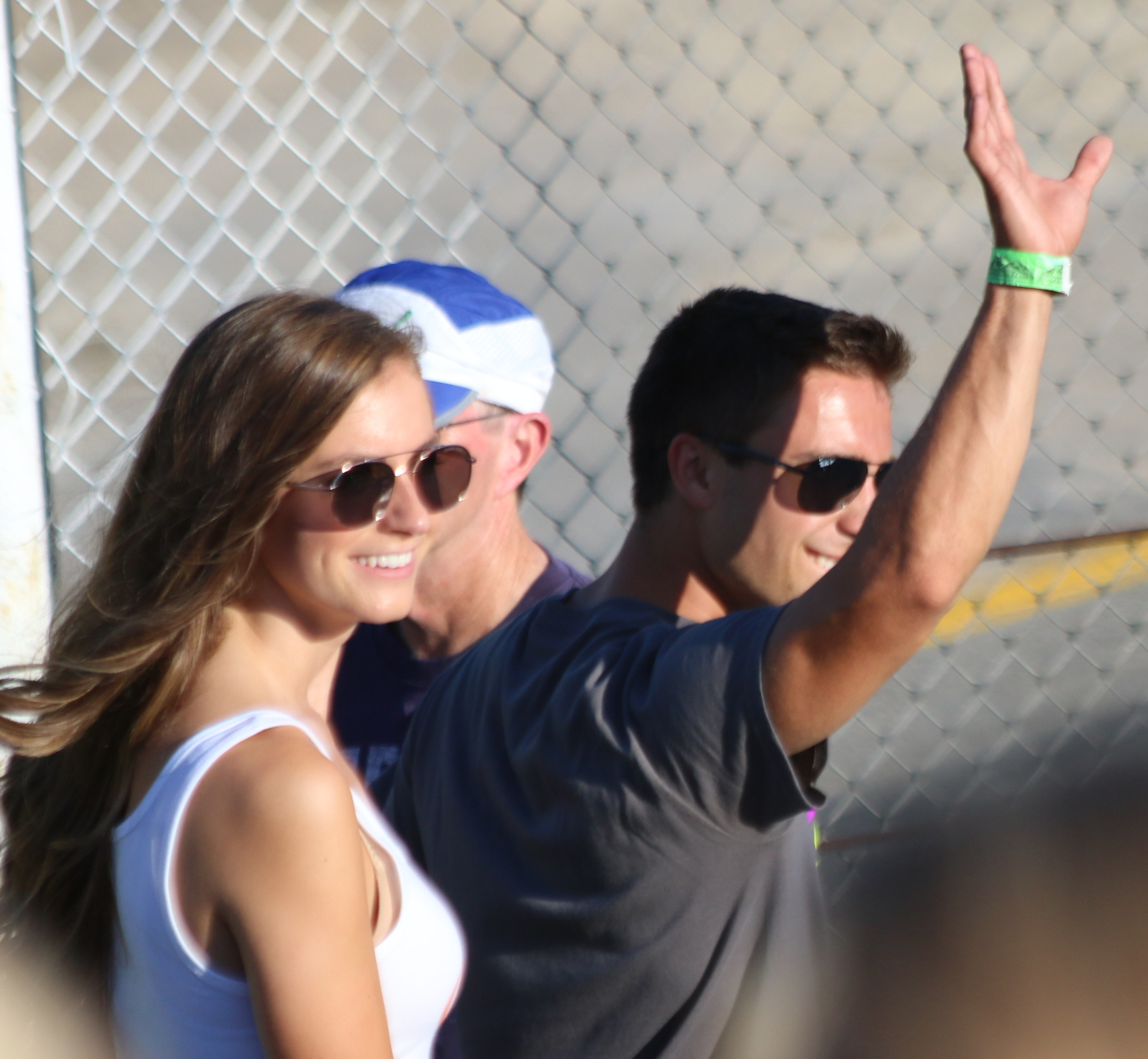
Majeski with his wife Ali

Majeski graduated from Seymour Community High School in 2013. In February 2017, Majeski moved from his home state of Wisconsin to North Carolina to be closer to the racing community. He reportedly took off a semester at UW-Madison as a senior majoring in mechanical engineering. He was the number one ranked oval player in the world for the online racing simulator iRacing from December 2016 until December 2021, which sponsors him in his racing. In early August 2018, Majeski announced his engagement to Ali VanderLoop on Twitter.

When Majeski began working at ThorSport Racing in 2021, he moved from North Carolina to Ohio (although he still owned his North Carolina home), since unlike most NASCAR teams, ThorSport's shop is located in Sandusky, Ohio instead of the Charlotte metropolitan area. The Thorson family (the owners of ThorSport) led Majeski to temporarily stay in the same housing development as them while he is searching for a permanent home in the area.

== Motorsports career results ==
=== Racing career summary ===
Season	Series	Team	Races	Wins	Top 5	Top 10	Points	Position
2016	ARCA Racing Series	Roulo Brothers Racing	4	0	1	2	750	36th
2017	ARCA Racing Series	Cunningham Motorsports	5	0	1	5	1005	29th
2017	NASCAR Xfinity Series	Roush Fenway Racing	3	0	0	1	61	45th
2018	NASCAR Xfinity Series	Roush Fenway Racing	12	0	0	2	155	34th
2019	NASCAR K&N Pro Series West	Chad Bryant Racing	1	0	0	0	24	60th
2019	ARCA Menards Series	Chad Bryant Racing	6	3	6	6	1375	20th
2019	NASCAR Gander Outdoors Truck Series	Niece Motorsports	1	0	0	0	26	66th
2020	NASCAR Gander Outdoors Truck Series	Niece Motorsports	15	0	0	3	299	21st
2021	NASCAR Camping World Truck Series	ThorSport Racing	4	0	0	2	109	34th
2022	NASCAR Camping World Truck Series	ThorSport Racing	23	2	10	15	4017	4th
2023	ASA STARS National Tour	Gearheadz Motorsports	10	3	6	7	700	**1st**
2023	NASCAR Craftsman Truck Series	ThorSport Racing	23	1	8	14	2185	8th
2024	ASA STARS National Tour	Gearheadz Motorsports	4	1	2	2	285	12th
2024	NASCAR Craftsman Truck Series	ThorSport Racing	23	3	10	14	4040	**1st**
2025	ASA STARS National Tour	Gearheadz Motorsports	6	1	3	4	399	12th
2025	NASCAR Craftsman Truck Series	ThorSport Racing	25	0	10	18	4035	**2nd**
2026	ASA STARS National Tour	Gearheadz Motorsports	2	0	2	2	173*	18th*
2026	NASCAR Craftsman Truck Series	ThorSport Racing	25	0	9	13	2319	4th

=== NASCAR ===
(key) (Bold – Pole position awarded by qualifying time. Italics – Pole position earned by points standings or practice time. * – Most laps led.)

==== Xfinity Series ====
NASCAR Xfinity Series results
Year	Team	No.	Make	1	2	3	4	5	6	7	8	9	10	11	12	13	14	15	16	17	18	19	20	21	22	23	24	25	26	27	28	29	30	31	32	33	NXSC	Pts	Ref
2017	Roush Fenway Racing	60	Ford	DAY	ATL	LVS	PHO	CAL	TEX	BRI	RCH	TAL	CLT	DOV	POC	MCH	IOW; 34	DAY	KEN	NHA	IND	IOW; 16	GLN	MOH	BRI	ROA	DAR	RCH	CHI	KEN	DOV	CLT	KAN	TEX	PHO	HOM; 10	45th	61	
2018	Roush Fenway Racing	60	Ford	DAY	ATL	LVS	PHO	CAL	TEX	BRI; 34	RCH	TAL; 37	DOV; 34	CLT; 22	POC	MCH	IOW; 7	CHI	DAY	KEN; 27	NHA	IOW	GLN	MOH	BRI	ROA; 28	DAR	IND	LVS	RCH; 34	ROV; 34	DOV	KAN; 8	TEX; 13	PHO; 18	HOM	34th	155	

==== Craftsman Truck Series ====
NASCAR Craftsman Truck Series results
Year	Team	No.	Make	1	2	3	4	5	6	7	8	9	10	11	12	13	14	15	16	17	18	19	20	21	22	23	24	25	NCTC	Pts	Ref
2019	Niece Motorsports	44	Chevy	DAY	ATL	LVS	MAR	TEX	DOV	KAN	CLT	TEX	IOW	GTW	CHI	KEN	POC	ELD	MCH	BRI	MSP	LVS	TAL	MAR	PHO; 11	HOM			66th	26	
2020	Niece Motorsports	45	Chevy	DAY; 32	LVS; 13	CLT; 8	ATL; 19	HOM; 10	POC; 36	KEN; 19	TEX; 15	KAN; 11	KAN; 30	MCH; 15	DRC; 32	DOV; 14	GTW; 9	DAR; 13	RCH	BRI	LVS	TAL	KAN	TEX	MAR	PHO			21st	299	
2021	ThorSport Racing	66	Toyota	DAY	DRC	LVS	ATL	BRD	RCH	KAN	DAR	COA	CLT; 7	TEX	NSH; 8	POC; 14	KNX	GLN	GTW; 33	DAR	BRI	LVS	TAL	MAR	PHO				34th	109	
2022	ThorSport Racing	66	Toyota	**DAY**; 7	LVS; 10	ATL; 3	COA; 30	MAR; 11	BRD; 21	DAR; 4	KAN; 2	TEX; 5	**CLT**; 13	GTW; 32	SON; 3	KNX; 4	NSH; 4	MOH; 12	POC; 7	IRP; 8	**RCH**; 3	KAN; 8	BRI; 1	TAL; 23	HOM; 1*	PHO; 20			4th	4017	
2023	ThorSport Racing	98	Ford	DAY; 6	LVS; 5	ATL; 11	COA; 3	TEX; 4	BRD; 2	MAR; 4	KAN; 25	DAR; 31	NWS; 2	CLT; 7	**GTW**; 30	NSH; 31	MOH; 7	POC; 6	**RCH**; 2*	IRP; 1*	MLW; 7	KAN; 18	BRI; 19	TAL; 21	HOM; 9	PHO; 14*			8th	2185	
2024	ThorSport Racing	98	Ford	**DAY**; 15	ATL; 2	LVS; 10*	BRI; 34	COA; 3	**MAR**; 2	TEX; 10	KAN; 33	DAR; 5	NWS; 11	CLT; 23	**GTW**; 4	NSH; 9	POC; 31	IRP; 1	RCH; 1	**MLW**; 2	BRI; 8	**KAN**; 15	TAL; 12	HOM; 2	MAR; 11	**PHO**; 1*			1st	4040	
2025	ThorSport Racing	98	Ford	DAY; 3	ATL; 8	LVS; 4	HOM; 11	MAR; 13	BRI; 33	CAR; 31	TEX; 10	KAN; 14	NWS; 6	CLT; 32	NSH; 8	MCH; 15	POC; 9	LRP; 2	IRP; 5	GLN; 7	RCH; 2*	DAR; 4	BRI; 4	NHA; 5	ROV; 8	TAL; 3	MAR; 7	PHO; 2	2nd	4035	
2026	ThorSport Racing	88	Ford	**DAY**; 4	ATL; 28	STP; 2	DAR; 31	CAR; 8	BRI; 23	TEX; 9	GLN; 24	DOV; 2	CLT; 33	NSH; 12	**MCH**; 35	COR; 5	LRP; 32	NWS; 10	IRP; 3	RCH; 19	NHA; 11	BRI; 9	KAN; 29	CLT; 11	PHO; 4	**TAL**; 4	MAR; 4	HOM; 4	4th	2319	

^{*} Season still in progress
^{1} Ineligible for series points

=== ARCA Menards Series ===
(key) (Bold – Pole position awarded by qualifying time. Italics – Pole position earned by points standings or practice time. * – Most laps led.)

ARCA Menards Series results
Year	Team	No.	Make	1	2	3	4	5	6	7	8	9	10	11	12	13	14	15	16	17	18	19	20	AMSC	Pts	Ref
2016	Roulo Brothers Racing	17	Ford	DAY	NSH	SLM	TAL	TOL	NJE	POC	MCH	MAD; 4	WIN	IOW	IRP; 12	POC	BLN	ISF	DSF	SLM	CHI; 8	KEN	KAN; 11	36th	750	
2017	Cunningham Motorsports	99	Ford	DAY	NSH	SLM	TAL	TOL	ELK	POC; 7	MCH; 6	MAD	IOW	IRP	POC	WIN	ISF	ROA	DSF	SLM	CHI; 7	KEN; 6	KAN; 2	29th	1005	
2019	Chad Bryant Racing	22	Ford	DAY	FIF	SLM	TAL; 4	NSH	TOL	CLT; 1	POC; 1	MCH; 2	MAD	GTW	CHI; 1*	ELK	IOW	POC	ISF	DSF	SLM	IRP	KAN; 3	20th	1375	

==== K&N Pro Series West ====
NASCAR K&N Pro Series West results
Year	Team	No.	Make	1	2	3	4	5	6	7	8	9	10	11	12	13	14	NKNPSWC	Pts	Ref
2019	Chad Bryant Racing	2	Ford	LVS	IRW	TUS	TUS	CNS	SON	DCS	IOW	EVG	GTW	MER	AAS	KCR	PHO; 20	60th	24	

=== ASA STARS National Tour ===
(key) (Bold – Pole position awarded by qualifying time. Italics – Pole position earned by points standings or practice time. * – Most laps led. ** – All laps led.)

ASA STARS National Tour results
Year	Team	No.	Make	1	2	3	4	5	6	7	8	9	10	11	12	ASNTC	Pts	Ref
2023	Gearheadz Motorsports	91	Chevy	FIF; 3												1st	700	
2023	Gearheadz Motorsports	91	Ford		MAD; 1*	NWS; 10	HCY; 4	**MLW**; 1*	AND; 3*	WIR; 1*	TOL; 13		NSV; 11			1st	700	
2023	Gearheadz Motorsports	91	Toyota									**WIN**; 21				1st	700	
2024	Gearheadz Motorsports	91	Ford	NSM; 16*	FIF	HCY	MAD; 1*	MLW; DSQ*	AND	OWO	TOL	WIN; 2	NSV			12th	285	
2025	Gearheadz Motorsports	91	Ford	NSM; 25*	FIF	DOM	HCY	NPS	MAD; 21	**SLG**; 2	AND	OWO	TOL; 5	WIN; 1*	NSV; 6	12th	399	
2026	Gearheadz Motorsports	91	Ford	NSM	FIF	HCY	**SLG**; 2*	MAD; 3	NPS	OWO	TRI	WIN	NSV	NSM; 2		-*	-*	

Sporting positions
Preceded by Dan Fredrickson	ARCA Midwest Tour champion 2014, 2015, 2016, 2017, 2021	Succeeded by Dalton Zehr
