= RTIC Outdoors =

American lifestyle product manufacturer

- Formerly: RTIC Coolers
- Company type: Private
- Industry: Outdoor recreation equipment Retail
- Founded: 2015; 11 years ago
- Founders: Jim Jacobsen; John Jacobsen
- Headquarters: Houston, Texas, U.S.
- Area served: United States
- Key people: Jim Jacobsen (Co-CEO); John Jacobsen (Co-CEO)
- Products: Coolers, drinkware, soft coolers, backpacks, outdoor accessories
- Owners: Wind Point Partners
- Website: rticoutdoors.com

RTIC Outdoors, formerly RTIC Coolers, is an American manufacturer and online retailer of outdoor equipment. It is based in Houston, Texas.

== History ==
RTIC Outdoors was founded in 2015 by twin brothers Jim and John Jacobsen as an online direct-to-consumer retailer of coolers and drinkware.

In July 2018, RTIC changed its name from RTIC Coolers to RTIC Outdoors as it expanded beyond coolers and drinkware into other outdoor products, including tents, chairs, backpacks, and grills. Later that year, RTIC opened its first flagship store spread over 10,000-square-foot in Katy, Texas.

In September 2020, RTIC was acquired by Wind Point Partners, a Chicago-based private equity firm. Following the acquisition, Bill Pond joined the company as chief executive officer.

In 2023, RTIC signed a multi-year sponsorship agreement with NASCAR to become its official cooler and drinkware sponsor. In 2024, the company expanded into more than 3,800 Walmart stores in the United States.

== Operations ==
RTIC is headquartered in Katy, Texas, and it operates a flagship store in Houston. It has two warehouses in the Houston area as well.

RTIC built its business as a direct-to-consumer retailer and later expanded into physical retail and wholesale distribution. It sells hard-sided and soft-sided coolers, bottles, tumblers, travel mugs, bags, chairs, and related outdoor accessories.
