= Carson Ferguson =

American racing driver

- Born: Carson Ferguson; March 22, 2000 (age 26); Charlotte, North Carolina, U.S.
- Achievements: 2022, 2023 Schaeffer's Oil Spring Nationals Series Champion; 2019 FASTRAK Racing Series Champion; Only driver to ever win all 3 INEX Legend Car National Finals events in the same year (2014); 2014 INEX Legend Cars Young Lions National Champion; 2011 INEX Bandolero Bandit National Champion; 2012, 2014, 2018 INEX Legend Car Asphalt Nationals Winner; 2014, 2020, 2021 INEX Legend Car Road Course World Finals Winner; 2014 INEX Legend Car Dirt Nationals Winner
- Awards: 2019 FASTRAK Racing Series Rookie of the Year

NASCAR FedEx Freight Truck Series career
- 3 races run over 1 year
- 2026 position: 61st
- Best finish: 61st (2026)
- First race: 2026 Tennessee Army National Guard 250 (Bristol)
- Last race: 2026 Black's Tire 200 (Martinsville)
Wins	Top tens	Poles
0	0	0
- Statistics up to date as of November 6, 2026.

Carson Ferguson (born March 22, 2000) is an American professional dirt track racing and stock car racing driver. He currently competes full-time in the Lucas Oil Late Model Dirt Series, driving the No. 93 Longhorn Chassis for Paylor Motorsports. He has previously competed in the NASCAR Craftsman Truck Series. He is the younger cousin of Dirt Super Late Model driver, Chris Ferguson.

== Racing career ==
=== Early career ===
Ferguson started his career at the age of four in go-karts, amassing over 50 wins and the North Carolina and South Carolina Maxxis State Title championships. At the age of eight, he would move to Bandolero's, where he would score the National Championship in 2011, as well as the Summer Shootout championship at Charlotte Motor Speedway in the same year.

In 2012, Ferguson would move up to Legend Car's, scoring over 75 wins including the 2012 Aphalt Nationals, becoming the youngest ever to do so, the 2014 and 2019 Summer Shootout championship, 2014 and 2020 Road Course World Finals, 2014 Dirt Nationals, and was the only driver to ever win all three INEX nationals in a single season.

=== Dirt Late Models ===
In 2014, Ferguson would move up to Dirt Late Model's, competing for his cousin Chris Ferguson's team.

=== Craftsman Truck Series ===
==== 2026 ====
In late 2025, Ferguson would participate in the Race For the Seat reality show presented by Kaulig Racing and Ram Trucks competing for a full-time NASCAR Craftsman Truck Series ride with the team in their No. 14 truck. The competition would come down to a two-way battle between him and Mini Tyrrell for the seat, with Tyrrell coming out on top. Ferguson would win the championship race for the series, giving him a one race deal with the team to compete at Martinsville in the fall of that year. On April 3, 2026, it was revealed that Ferguson will make his Truck Series debut early, running at Bristol Motor Speedway for Kaulig.

== Personal life ==
Ferguson is a Christian and was engaged to his girlfriend, Makenna Adkins in December 2025.

== Motorsports career results ==
=== Stock car career summary ===
Season	Series	Team	Races	Wins	Top 5	Top 10	Points	Position
2026	NASCAR Craftsman Truck Series	Kaulig Racing	3	0	0	0	26	61st

=== NASCAR ===
(key) (Bold – Pole position awarded by qualifying time. Italics – Pole position earned by points standings or practice time. * – Most laps led.)

==== Craftsman Truck Series ====
NASCAR Craftsman Truck Series results
Year	Team	No.	Make	1	2	3	4	5	6	7	8	9	10	11	12	13	14	15	16	17	18	19	20	21	22	23	24	25	NCTC	Pts	Ref
2026	Kaulig Racing	25	Ram	DAY	ATL	STP	DAR	CAR	BRI; 21	TEX	GLN	DOV	CLT	NSH; 35	MCH	COR	LRP	NWS	IRP	RCH	NHA	BRI	KAN	CLT	PHO	TAL	MAR; 29	HOM	61st	26	

^{*} Season still in progress
^{1} Ineligible for series points

Sporting positions
Preceded by Dale McDowell	Schaeffer's Oil Spring Nationals Series Champion; 2022, 2023	Succeeded by Donald McIntosh
Preceded by Matthew Nance	FASTRAK Racing Series Champion; 2019	Succeeded by Matt Long
Preceded by William Byron	INEX Legend Cars Young Lions National Champion; 2014	Succeeded by Chase Purdy
Preceded by Clayton Weatherman	INEX Bandolero Bandit National Champion; 2011	Succeeded by Michael Meek
Achievements
Preceded by Josh Morris; Tripp Gerrald	INEX Legend Car Asphalt Nationals Winner; 2012, 2014, 2018	Succeeded by Tripp Gerrald; Eddie Fatscher; Zach Miller
Preceded by Peyton Saxton; Sean Rayhall	INEX Legend Car Road Course World Finals Winner; 2014, 2020, 2021	Succeeded by Eddie Fatscher; Landen Lewis
Preceded by Brady Petermann	INEX Legend Car Dirt Nationals Winner; 2014	Succeeded by Joshua Hicks
