= 2026 Black's Tire 200 (Martinsville) =

NASCAR Craftsman Truck Series race at Martinsville Speedway

2026 Black's Tire 200 presented by Down East Heating & Air Conditioning
Race details
- Race 24 of 25 in the 2026 NASCAR Craftsman Truck Series
- Date: October 30, 2026
- Location: Martinsville Speedway in Martinsville, Virginia
- Course: Permanent racing facility
- Course length: 0.526 miles (0.847 km)
- Distance: 200 laps, 105.2 mi (169.302 km)
- Average speed: 57.899 miles per hour (93.179 km/h)

Pole position
Driver	Tristan McKee	Spire Motorsports
- Time: 19.549

Most laps led
Driver	Layne Riggs	Front Row Motorsports
- Laps: 156

Fastest lap
Driver	Layne Riggs	Front Row Motorsports
- Time: 20.277

Winner
No. 38	Chandler Smith	Front Row Motorsports

Television in the United States
- Network: FS1
- Announcers: Jamie Little, Michael Waltrip, and Brad Keselowski

Radio in the United States
- Radio: NRN
- Booth announcers: Alex Hayden and Mike Bagley
- Turn announcers: Dave Moody (Backstretch)

The 2026 Black's Tire 200 presented by Down East Heating & Air Conditioning was a NASCAR Craftsman Truck Series race held on Friday, October 30, 2026, at Martinsville Speedway in Martinsville, Virginia. Contested over 200 laps on the 0.526-mile (0.847 km) paperclip-shaped short track, it was the 24th race of the 2026 NASCAR Craftsman Truck Series season, the sixth race in the NASCAR Chase, and the 22nd running of the event.

In a late wreck-filled race, Chandler Smith, driving for Front Row Motorsports, made a surge to the lead on the final restart over teammate Layne Riggs, and led the final 11 laps to earn his tenth career NASCAR Craftsman Truck Series win, and his third of the season. Riggs swept both stages and led the race-high 156 laps. At race's end, Ben Rhodes finished second, and Riggs finished third. Ty Majeski and pole-sitter Tristan McKee rounded out the top five, while Andrés Pérez de Lara, Tyler Ankrum, Gio Ruggiero, William Sawalich, and Christian Eckes rounded out the top ten.

Following the race, Smith, Majeski, and Eckes were mathimatically eliminated from championship contention.

== Report ==
=== Background ===
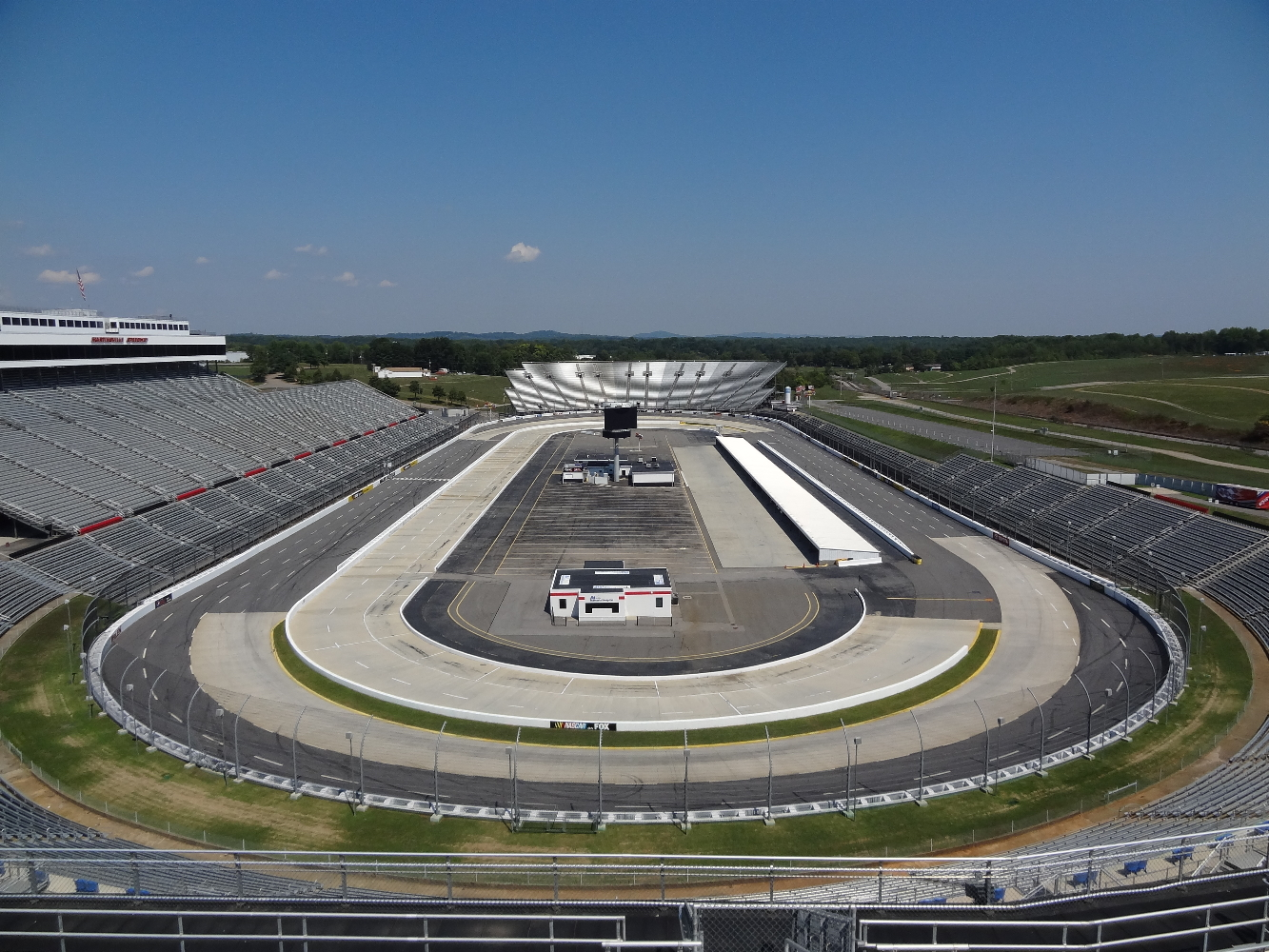
Martinsville Speedway, the track where the race was held.

Martinsville Speedway is an International Speedway Corporation-owned NASCAR stock car racing track located in Henry County, in Ridgeway, Virginia, just to the south of Martinsville. At 0.526 miles (0.847 km) in length, it is the shortest track in the NASCAR Cup Series. The track is also one of the first paved oval tracks in NASCAR, being built in 1947 by H. Clay Earles. It is also the only race track that has been on the NASCAR circuit from its beginning in 1948. Along with this, Martinsville is the only NASCAR oval track on the entire NASCAR track circuit to have asphalt surfaces on the straightaways, then concrete to cover the turns.

Black's Tire Service, as well as Down East Heating & Air Conditioning, was announced as the title sponsor for the event on October 14.

==== Entry list ====
- (R) denotes rookie driver.
- (i) denotes driver who is ineligible for series driver points.
- (CC) denotes chase contender.
- (OC) denotes owners' chase contender truck.

#	Driver	Team	Make
1	Gavan Boschele (OC)	Tricon Garage	Toyota
2	Monty Tipton	Team Reaume	Ford
4	Conner Jones	Niece Motorsports	Chevrolet
5	William Sawalich (i)	Tricon Garage	Toyota
7	Sammy Smith (OC) (i)	Spire Motorsports	Chevrolet
9	Grant Enfinger (CC)	CR7 Motorsports	Chevrolet
10	Corey LaJoie	Kaulig Racing	Ram
11	Kaden Honeycutt (CC)	Tricon Garage	Toyota
12	Brenden Queen (R)	Kaulig Racing	Ram
13	Cole Butcher (R)	ThorSport Racing	Ford
14	Mini Tyrrell (R)	Kaulig Racing	Ram
15	Tanner Gray	Tricon Garage	Toyota
16	Justin Haley	Kaulig Racing	Ram
17	Gio Ruggiero (CC)	Tricon Garage	Toyota
18	Tyler Ankrum (CC)	McAnally–Hilgemann Racing	Chevrolet
19	Daniel Hemric (CC)	McAnally–Hilgemann Racing	Chevrolet
22	Josh Reaume	Team Reaume	Ford
25	Carson Ferguson	Kaulig Racing	Ram
33	Frankie Muniz	Team Reaume	Ford
34	Layne Riggs (CC)	Front Row Motorsports	Ford
38	Chandler Smith (CC)	Front Row Motorsports	Ford
42	Tyler Reif	Niece Motorsports	Chevrolet
44	Andrés Pérez de Lara	Niece Motorsports	Chevrolet
45	Landen Lewis (OC)	Niece Motorsports	Chevrolet
52	Stewart Friesen	Halmar Friesen Racing	Toyota
56	Timmy Hill	Hill Motorsports	Toyota
62	Kasey Kleyn	Halmar Friesen Racing	Toyota
69	Tyler Tomassi (i)	MBM Motorsports	Ram
76	Spencer Boyd	Freedom Racing Enterprises	Chevrolet
77	Tristan McKee (OC)	Spire Motorsports	Chevrolet
81	Kris Wright	McAnally–Hilgemann Racing	Chevrolet
88	Ty Majeski (CC)	ThorSport Racing	Ford
90	Justin Carroll	TC Motorsports	Toyota
91	Christian Eckes (CC)	McAnally–Hilgemann Racing	Chevrolet
98	Jake Garcia	ThorSport Racing	Ford
99	Ben Rhodes (CC)	ThorSport Racing	Ford
Official entry list

== Practice ==
The first and only practice session was held on Friday, October 30, at 12:30 PM EST, and lasted for 50 minutes.

Chandler Smith, driving for Front Row Motorsports, set the fastest time in the session, with a lap of 19.841 seconds, and a speed of 95.439 miles per hour (153.594 km/h).

=== Practice results ===
Pos.	#	Driver	Team	Make	Time	Speed
1	38	Chandler Smith (CC)	Front Row Motorsports	Ford	19.841	95.439
2	77	Tristan McKee (OC)	Spire Motorsports	Chevrolet	19.842	95.434
3	11	Kaden Honeycutt (CC)	Tricon Garage	Toyota	19.846	95.415
Full practice results

== Qualifying ==
Qualifying was held on Friday, October 30, at 1:35 PM EST. Since Martinsville Speedway is a short track, the qualifying procedure used is was single-car, two-lap system with one round. Drivers were on track by themselves and had two laps to post a qualifying time, and whoever set the fastest time won the pole.

Tristan McKee, driving for Spire Motorsports, qualified on pole position with a lap of 19.549 seconds, and a speed of 96.864 miles per hour (155.887 km/h), becoming the youngest pole winner in series history at 16 years, 2 months, and 27 days old.

No drivers failed to qualify.

=== Qualifying results ===
Pos.	#	Driver	Team	Make	Time	Speed
1	77	Tristan McKee (OC)	Spire Motorsports	Chevrolet	19.549	96.864
2	34	Layne Riggs (CC)	Front Row Motorsports	Ford	19.567	96.775
3	38	Chandler Smith (CC)	Front Row Motorsports	Ford	19.584	96.691
4	99	Ben Rhodes (CC)	ThorSport Racing	Ford	19.621	96.509
5	11	Kaden Honeycutt (CC)	Tricon Garage	Toyota	19.639	96.420
6	88	Ty Majeski (CC)	ThorSport Racing	Ford	19.676	96.239
7	91	Christian Eckes (CC)	McAnally–Hilgemann Racing	Chevrolet	19.678	96.229
8	7	Sammy Smith (OC) (i)	Spire Motorsports	Chevrolet	19.729	95.981
9	18	Tyler Ankrum (CC)	McAnally–Hilgemann Racing	Chevrolet	19.736	95.946
10	15	Tanner Gray	Tricon Garage	Toyota	19.739	95.932
11	17	Gio Ruggiero (CC)	Tricon Garage	Toyota	19.750	95.878
12	45	Landen Lewis (OC)	Niece Motorsports	Chevrolet	19.780	95.733
13	44	Andrés Pérez de Lara	Niece Motorsports	Chevrolet	19.824	95.521
14	52	Stewart Friesen	Halmar Friesen Racing	Toyota	19.868	95.309
15	19	Daniel Hemric (CC)	McAnally–Hilgemann Racing	Chevrolet	19.872	95.290
16	42	Tyler Reif	Niece Motorsports	Chevrolet	19.872	95.290
17	16	Justin Haley	Kaulig Racing	Ram	19.888	95.213
18	5	William Sawalich (i)	Tricon Garage	Toyota	19.909	95.113
19	9	Grant Enfinger (CC)	CR7 Motorsports	Chevrolet	19.913	95.094
20	12	Brenden Queen (R)	Kaulig Racing	Ram	19.918	95.070
21	4	Conner Jones	Niece Motorsports	Chevrolet	19.929	95.017
22	13	Cole Butcher (R)	ThorSport Racing	Ford	19.952	94.908
23	62	Kasey Kleyn	Halmar Friesen Racing	Toyota	19.973	94.808
24	56	Timmy Hill	Hill Motorsports	Toyota	20.008	94.642
25	14	Mini Tyrrell (R)	Kaulig Racing	Ram	20.030	94.538
26	22	Josh Reaume	Team Reaume	Ford	20.069	94.354
27	25	Carson Ferguson	Kaulig Racing	Ram	20.083	94.289
28	81	Kris Wright	McAnally–Hilgemann Racing	Chevrolet	20.147	93.989
29	10	Corey LaJoie	Kaulig Racing	Ram	20.149	93.980
30	33	Frankie Muniz	Team Reaume	Ford	20.166	93.901
31	76	Spencer Boyd	Freedom Racing Enterprises	Chevrolet	20.196	93.761
Qualified by owner's points
32	2	Monty Tipton	Team Reaume	Ford	20.203	93.729
33	90	Justin Carroll	TC Motorsports	Toyota	20.494	92.398
34	69	Tyler Tomassi (i)	MBM Motorsports	Ram	20.743	91.289
35	1	Gavan Boschele (OC)	Tricon Garage	Toyota	—	—
36	98	Jake Garcia	ThorSport Racing	Ford	—	—
Official qualifying results
Official starting lineup

== Race ==
=== Race results ===
==== Stage Results ====
Stage One Laps: 50

Pos.	#	Driver	Team	Make	Pts
1	34	Layne Riggs (CC)	Front Row Motorsports	Ford	10
2	77	Tristan McKee (OC)	Spire Motorsports	Chevrolet	9
3	38	Chandler Smith (CC)	Front Row Motorsports	Ford	8
4	99	Ben Rhodes (CC)	ThorSport Racing	Ford	7
5	88	Ty Majeski (CC)	ThorSport Racing	Ford	6
6	91	Christian Eckes (CC)	McAnally–Hilgemann Racing	Chevrolet	5
7	11	Kaden Honeycutt (CC)	Tricon Garage	Toyota	4
8	18	Tyler Ankrum (CC)	McAnally–Hilgemann Racing	Chevrolet	3
9	44	Andrés Pérez de Lara	Niece Motorsports	Chevrolet	2
10	17	Gio Ruggiero (CC)	Tricon Garage	Toyota	1

Stage Two Laps: 50

Pos.	#	Driver	Team	Make	Pts
1	34	Layne Riggs (CC)	Front Row Motorsports	Ford	10
2	77	Tristan McKee (OC)	Spire Motorsports	Chevrolet	9
3	38	Chandler Smith (CC)	Front Row Motorsports	Ford	8
4	99	Ben Rhodes (CC)	ThorSport Racing	Ford	7
5	88	Ty Majeski (CC)	ThorSport Racing	Ford	6
6	11	Kaden Honeycutt (CC)	Tricon Garage	Toyota	5
7	91	Christian Eckes (CC)	McAnally–Hilgemann Racing	Chevrolet	4
8	18	Tyler Ankrum (CC)	McAnally–Hilgemann Racing	Chevrolet	3
9	44	Andrés Pérez de Lara	Niece Motorsports	Chevrolet	2
10	98	Jake Garcia	ThorSport Racing	Ford	1

=== Final Stage Results ===
Stage Three Laps: 100

Fin	St	#	Driver	Team	Make	Laps	Led	Status	Pts
1	3	38	Chandler Smith (CC)	Front Row Motorsports	Ford	200	12	Running	71
2	4	99	Ben Rhodes (CC)	ThorSport Racing	Ford	200	0	Running	49
3	2	34	Layne Riggs (CC)	Front Row Motorsports	Ford	200	156	Running	55
4	6	88	Ty Majeski (CC)	ThorSport Racing	Ford	200	0	Running	45
5	1	77	Tristan McKee (OC)	Spire Motorsports	Chevrolet	200	29	Running	50
6	13	44	Andrés Pérez de Lara	Niece Motorsports	Chevrolet	200	0	Running	35
7	9	18	Tyler Ankrum (CC)	McAnally–Hilgemann Racing	Chevrolet	200	0	Running	36
8	11	17	Gio Ruggiero (CC)	Tricon Garage	Toyota	200	0	Running	30
9	18	5	William Sawalich (i)	Tricon Garage	Toyota	200	0	Running	0
10	7	91	Christian Eckes (CC)	McAnally–Hilgemann Racing	Chevrolet	200	0	Running	36
11	19	9	Grant Enfinger (CC)	CR7 Motorsports	Chevrolet	200	0	Running	26
12	20	12	Brenden Queen (R)	Kaulig Racing	Ram	200	0	Running	25
13	36	98	Jake Garcia	ThorSport Racing	Ford	200	0	Running	25
14	5	11	Kaden Honeycutt (CC)	Tricon Garage	Toyota	200	0	Running	32
15	15	19	Daniel Hemric (CC)	McAnally–Hilgemann Racing	Chevrolet	200	0	Running	22
16	23	62	Kasey Kleyn	Halmar Friesen Racing	Toyota	200	0	Running	21
17	25	14	Mini Tyrrell (R)	Kaulig Racing	Ram	200	0	Running	20
18	10	15	Tanner Gray	Tricon Garage	Toyota	200	0	Running	19
19	12	45	Landen Lewis (OC)	Niece Motorsports	Chevrolet	200	0	Running	18
20	29	10	Corey LaJoie	Kaulig Racing	Ram	200	0	Running	17
21	28	81	Kris Wright	McAnally–Hilgemann Racing	Chevrolet	200	0	Running	16
22	22	13	Cole Butcher (R)	ThorSport Racing	Ford	200	0	Running	15
23	31	76	Spencer Boyd	Freedom Racing Enterprises	Chevrolet	199	0	Running	14
24	35	1	Gavan Boschele (OC)	Tricon Garage	Toyota	198	0	Running	13
25	30	33	Frankie Muniz	Team Reaume	Ford	198	0	Running	12
26	26	22	Josh Reaume	Team Reaume	Ford	198	0	Running	11
27	16	42	Tyler Reif	Niece Motorsports	Chevrolet	198	0	Running	10
28	34	69	Tyler Tomassi (i)	MBM Motorsports	Ram	196	0	Running	0
29	27	25	Carson Ferguson	Kaulig Racing	Ram	179	0	Accident	8
30	14	52	Stewart Friesen	Halmar Friesen Racing	Toyota	147	3	Accident	7
31	24	56	Timmy Hill	Hill Motorsports	Toyota	146	0	Accident	6
32	33	90	Justin Carroll	TC Motorsports	Toyota	141	0	Accident	5
33	8	7	Sammy Smith (OC) (i)	Spire Motorsports	Chevrolet	129	0	Suspension	0
34	17	16	Justin Haley	Kaulig Racing	Ram	119	0	Accident	3
35	32	2	Monty Tipton	Team Reaume	Ford	115	0	Accident	2
36	21	4	Conner Jones	Niece Motorsports	Chevrolet	95	0	Rear Gear	1
Official race results

=== Race statistics ===
- Lead changes: 7 among 4 different drivers
- Cautions/Laps: 9 for 67 laps
- Red flags: 2
- Time of race: 1 hour, 49 minutes and 1 second
- Average speed: 57.899 miles per hour (93.179 km/h)

== Standings after the race ==
Drivers' Championship standings

	Pos	Driver	Points
	1	Kaden Honeycutt	2,403
	2	Layne Riggs	2,383 (–20)
1	3	Chandler Smith	2,300 (–103)
1	4	Ty Majeski	2,275 (–128)
	5	Christian Eckes	2,263 (–140)
	6	Gio Ruggiero	2,224 (–179)
1	7	Ben Rhodes	2,217 (–186)
1	8	Daniel Hemric	2,199 (–204)
	9	Tyler Ankrum	2,193 (–210)
	10	Grant Enfinger	2,178 (–225)
Official driver's standings

Manufacturers' Championship standings

Pos	Manufacturer	Points
1	Ford	1,020
2	Toyota	968 (–52)
3	Chevrolet	917 (–103)
4	Ram	595 (–400)

- Note: Only the first 10 positions are included for the driver standings.

Previous race: 2026 Love's RV Stop 225	NASCAR Craftsman Truck Series; 2026 season	Next race: 2026 Craftsman 200
