= 2026 Tennessee Army National Guard 250 =

NASCAR Craftsman Truck Series race at Bristol Motor Speedway

Race details
- Race 6 of 25 in the 2026 NASCAR Craftsman Truck Series
- Date: April 10, 2026
- Location: Bristol Motor Speedway in Bristol, Tennessee
- Course: Permanent racing facility
- Course length: 0.533 miles (0.858 km)
- Distance: 250 laps, 133.25 mi (214.45 km)
- Average speed: 66.644 miles per hour (107.253 km/h)

Pole position
Driver	Kaden Honeycutt	Tricon Garage
- Time: 15.066

Most laps led
Driver	Christian Eckes	McAnally–Hilgemann Racing
- Laps: 132

Fastest lap
Driver	Christian Eckes	McAnally–Hilgemann Racing
- Time: 15.429

Winner
No. 62	Christopher Bell	Halmar Friesen Racing

Television in the United States
- Network: FS1
- Announcers: Jamie Little, Michael Waltrip, and Austin Cindric

Radio in the United States
- Radio: NRN
- Booth announcers: Brad Gillie and Mark Garrow
- Turn announcers: Nick Yeoman (Backstretch)

The 2026 Tennessee Army National Guard 250 was a NASCAR Craftsman Truck Series race held on April 10, 2026, at Bristol Motor Speedway in Bristol, Tennessee. Contested over 250 laps on the 0.533 miles (0.858 km) short track, it was the sixth race of the 2026 NASCAR Craftsman Truck Series season, and the sixth running of the event.

After a controversial wreck involving Christian Eckes and Corey Heim on lap 179, Christopher Bell, driving for Halmar Friesen Racing, emerged in the final stage by leading the final 63 laps to earn his eighth career NASCAR Craftsman Truck Series win, and his first of the season. Prior to the incident, Eckes dominated the majority of the event by winning the first stage and leading a race-high 132 laps. Chandler Smith finished second, and Gio Ruggiero finished third. Ross Chastain and Eckes rounded out the top five, while Jake Garcia, Dawson Sutton, Kyle Busch, Carson Hocevar, and Brenden Queen rounded out the top ten.

This was the last of three races for the Triple Truck Challenge. Since Bell won the race and was not eligible for Truck Series points, no driver was awarded the $50,000 bonus.

== Report ==
=== Background ===
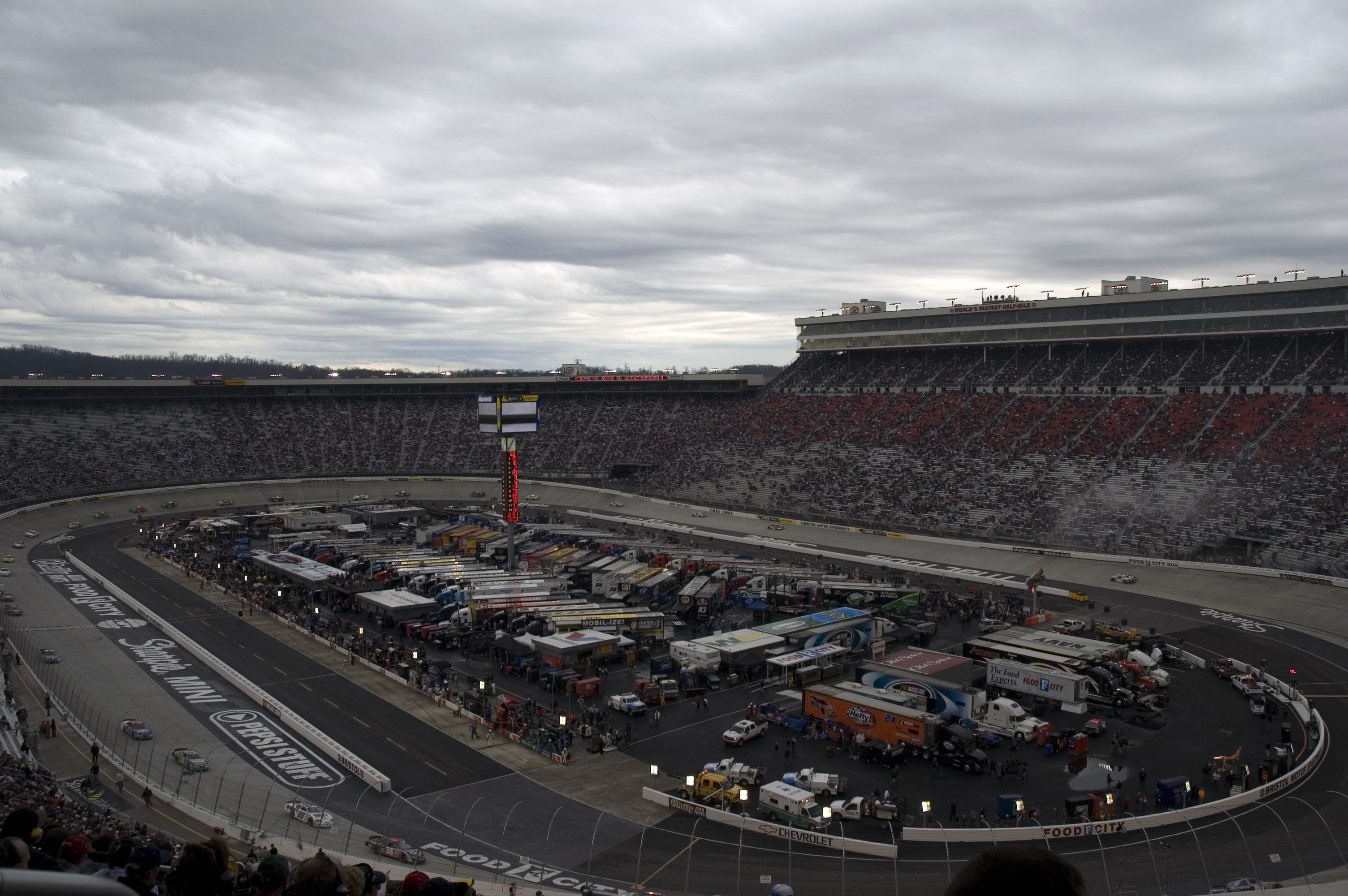
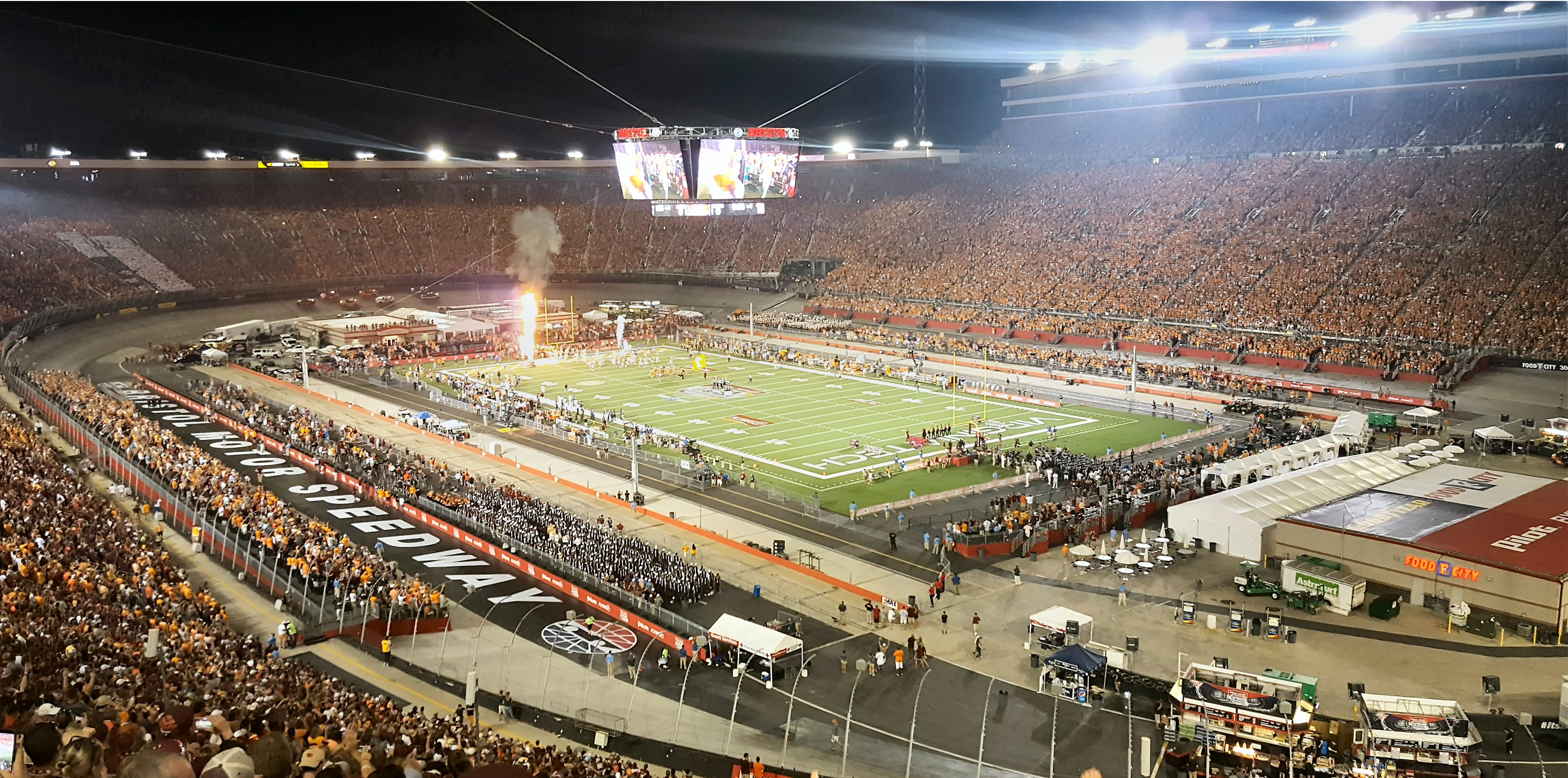
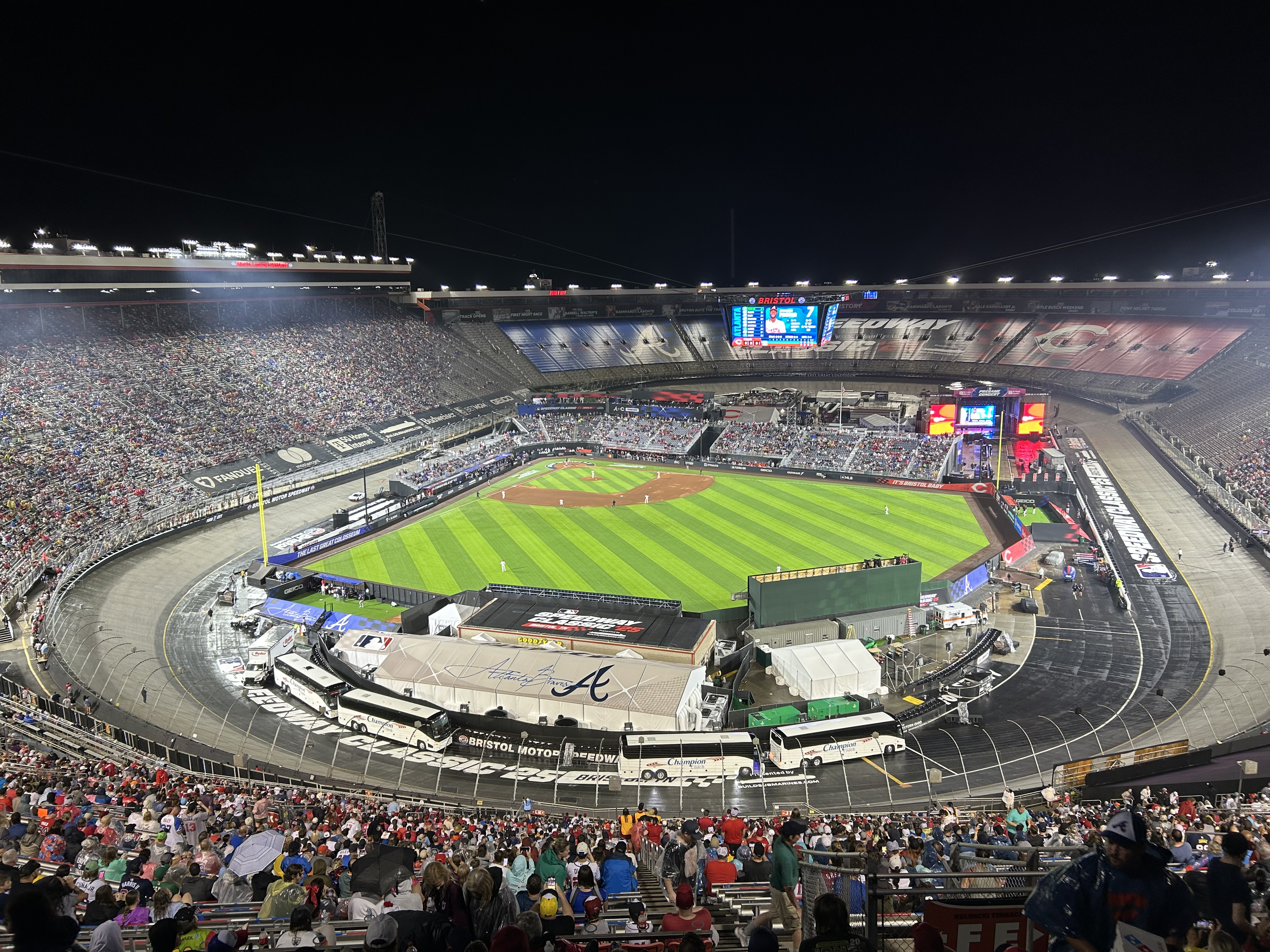
The Track (left) the Battle at Bristol (center) and the MLB Speedway Classic (right), are all events previously held at Bristol Motor Speedway.

The Bristol Motor Speedway, formerly known as Bristol International Raceway and Bristol Raceway, is a NASCAR short track venue located in Bristol, Tennessee. Constructed in 1960, it held its first NASCAR race on July 30, 1961. Despite its short length, Bristol is among the most popular tracks on the NASCAR schedule because of its distinct features, which include extraordinarily steep banking, an all-concrete surface, two pit roads, and stadium-like seating. It has also been named one of the loudest NASCAR tracks.

Besides holding racing events, the track has hosted the Battle at Bristol, a college football game between the Tennessee Volunteers and the Virginia Tech Hokies on September 10, 2016, and the MLB Speedway Classic, an MLB baseball game between the Atlanta Braves and the Cincinnati Reds from August 2-3, 2025.

Tennessee Army National Guard was announced as the title sponsor on December 2, 2025.

==== Entry list ====
- (R) denotes rookie driver.
- (i) denotes driver who is ineligible for series driver points.

#	Driver	Team	Make
1	Corey Heim	Tricon Garage	Toyota
2	Luke Baldwin	Team Reaume	Ford
4	Ricky Stenhouse Jr. (i)	Niece Motorsports	Chevrolet
5	Chase Briscoe (i)	Tricon Garage	Toyota
7	Kyle Busch (i)	Spire Motorsports	Chevrolet
9	Grant Enfinger	CR7 Motorsports	Chevrolet
10	Corey LaJoie	Kaulig Racing	Ram
11	Kaden Honeycutt	Tricon Garage	Toyota
12	Brenden Queen (R)	Kaulig Racing	Ram
13	Cole Butcher (R)	ThorSport Racing	Ford
14	Mini Tyrrell (R)	Kaulig Racing	Ram
15	Tanner Gray	Tricon Garage	Toyota
16	Justin Haley	Kaulig Racing	Ram
17	Gio Ruggiero	Tricon Garage	Toyota
18	Tyler Ankrum	McAnally–Hilgemann Racing	Chevrolet
19	Daniel Hemric	McAnally–Hilgemann Racing	Chevrolet
22	Clayton Green	Team Reaume	Ford
25	Carson Ferguson	Kaulig Racing	Ram
26	Dawson Sutton	Rackley W.A.R.	Chevrolet
33	Frankie Muniz	Team Reaume	Ford
34	Layne Riggs	Front Row Motorsports	Ford
38	Chandler Smith	Front Row Motorsports	Ford
42	Tyler Reif	Niece Motorsports	Chevrolet
44	Andrés Pérez de Lara	Niece Motorsports	Chevrolet
45	Ross Chastain (i)	Niece Motorsports	Chevrolet
52	Stewart Friesen	Halmar Friesen Racing	Toyota
56	Timmy Hill	Hill Motorsports	Toyota
62	Christopher Bell (i)	Halmar Friesen Racing	Toyota
71	Daniel Suárez (i)	Spire Motorsports	Chevrolet
76	Spencer Boyd	Freedom Racing Enterprises	Chevrolet
77	Carson Hocevar (i)	Spire Motorsports	Chevrolet
81	Kris Wright	McAnally–Hilgemann Racing	Chevrolet
88	Ty Majeski	ThorSport Racing	Ford
91	Christian Eckes	McAnally–Hilgemann Racing	Chevrolet
98	Jake Garcia	ThorSport Racing	Ford
99	Ben Rhodes	ThorSport Racing	Ford
Official entry list

== Practice ==
The first and only practice session was held on Friday, April 10, at 3:30 PM EST, and lasted for 50 minutes.

Chase Briscoe, driving for Tricon Garage, set the fastest time in the session, with a lap of 15.166 seconds, and a speed of 126.520 miles per hour (203.614 km/h).

=== Practice results ===
Pos.	#	Driver	Team	Make	Time	Speed
1	5	Chase Briscoe (i)	Tricon Garage	Toyota	15.166	126.520
2	11	Kaden Honeycutt	Tricon Garage	Toyota	15.169	126.495
3	77	Carson Hocevar (i)	Spire Motorsports	Chevrolet	15.254	125.790
Full practice results

== Qualifying ==
Qualifying was held on Friday, April 10, at 4:35 PM EST. Since Bristol Motor Speedway is a short track, the qualifying procedure used was a single-car, two-lap system with one round. Drivers were on track by themselves and had two laps to post a qualifying time, and whoever set the fastest time won the pole.

Kaden Honeycutt, driving for Tricon Garage, qualified on pole position with a lap of 15.066 seconds, and a speed of 127.360 miles per hour (204.966 km/h).

No drivers failed to qualify.

=== Qualifying results ===
Pos.	#	Driver	Team	Make	Time	Speed
1	11	Kaden Honeycutt	Tricon Garage	Toyota	15.066	127.360
2	91	Christian Eckes	McAnally–Hilgemann Racing	Chevrolet	15.085	127.199
3	34	Layne Riggs	Front Row Motorsports	Ford	15.101	127.064
4	5	Chase Briscoe (i)	Tricon Garage	Toyota	15.108	127.006
5	98	Jake Garcia	ThorSport Racing	Ford	15.139	126.745
6	88	Ty Majeski	ThorSport Racing	Ford	15.141	126.729
7	77	Carson Hocevar (i)	Spire Motorsports	Chevrolet	15.149	126.662
8	7	Kyle Busch (i)	Spire Motorsports	Chevrolet	15.162	126.553
9	99	Ben Rhodes	ThorSport Racing	Ford	15.168	126.503
10	17	Gio Ruggiero	Tricon Garage	Toyota	15.175	126.445
11	45	Ross Chastain (i)	Niece Motorsports	Chevrolet	15.182	126.387
12	1	Corey Heim	Tricon Garage	Toyota	15.188	126.337
13	52	Stewart Friesen	Halmar Friesen Racing	Toyota	15.189	126.328
14	16	Justin Haley	Kaulig Racing	Ram	15.196	126.270
15	62	Christopher Bell (i)	Halmar Friesen Racing	Toyota	15.206	126.187
16	38	Chandler Smith	Front Row Motorsports	Ford	15.237	125.930
17	13	Cole Butcher (R)	ThorSport Racing	Ford	15.241	125.897
18	9	Grant Enfinger	CR7 Motorsports	Chevrolet	15.243	125.881
19	10	Corey LaJoie	Kaulig Racing	Ram	15.257	125.765
20	18	Tyler Ankrum	McAnally–Hilgemann Racing	Chevrolet	15.277	125.601
21	4	Ricky Stenhouse Jr. (i)	Niece Motorsports	Chevrolet	15.287	125.518
22	15	Tanner Gray	Tricon Garage	Toyota	15.331	125.158
23	19	Daniel Hemric	McAnally–Hilgemann Racing	Chevrolet	15.359	124.930
24	42	Tyler Reif	Niece Motorsports	Chevrolet	15.394	124.646
25	81	Kris Wright	McAnally–Hilgemann Racing	Chevrolet	15.434	124.323
26	14	Mini Tyrrell (R)	Kaulig Racing	Ram	15.447	124.218
27	44	Andrés Pérez de Lara	Niece Motorsports	Chevrolet	15.456	124.146
28	12	Brenden Queen (R)	Kaulig Racing	Ram	15.457	124.138
29	25	Carson Ferguson	Kaulig Racing	Ram	15.484	123.921
30	2	Luke Baldwin	Team Reaume	Ford	15.497	123.818
31	33	Frankie Muniz	Team Reaume	Ford	15.801	121.435
Qualified by owner's points
32	22	Clayton Green	Team Reaume	Ford	15.862	120.968
33	76	Spencer Boyd	Freedom Racing Enterprises	Chevrolet	15.992	119.985
34	26	Dawson Sutton	Rackley W.A.R.	Chevrolet	—	—
35	56	Timmy Hill	Hill Motorsports	Toyota	—	—
36	71	Daniel Suárez (i)	Spire Motorsports	Chevrolet	—	—
Official qualifying results
Official starting lineup

== Race ==
=== Race results ===
==== Stage results ====
Stage One Laps: 65

Pos.	#	Driver	Team	Make	Pts
1	91	Christian Eckes	McAnally–Hilgemann Racing	Chevrolet	10
2	34	Layne Riggs	Front Row Motorsports	Ford	9
3	11	Kaden Honeycutt	Tricon Garage	Toyota	8
4	99	Ben Rhodes	ThorSport Racing	Ford	7
5	98	Jake Garcia	ThorSport Racing	Ford	6
6	77	Carson Hocevar (i)	Spire Motorsports	Chevrolet	0
7	17	Gio Ruggiero	Tricon Garage	Toyota	4
8	5	Chase Briscoe (i)	Tricon Garage	Toyota	0
9	45	Ross Chastain (i)	Niece Motorsports	Chevrolet	0
10	7	Kyle Busch (i)	Spire Motorsports	Chevrolet	0

Stage Two Laps: 65

Pos.	#	Driver	Team	Make	Pts
1	99	Ben Rhodes	ThorSport Racing	Ford	10
2	7	Kyle Busch (i)	Spire Motorsports	Chevrolet	0
3	16	Justin Haley	Kaulig Racing	Ram	8
4	1	Corey Heim	Tricon Garage	Toyota	7
5	62	Christopher Bell (i)	Halmar Friesen Racing	Toyota	0
6	91	Christian Eckes	McAnally–Hilgemann Racing	Chevrolet	5
7	10	Corey LaJoie	Kaulig Racing	Ram	4
8	11	Kaden Honeycutt	Tricon Garage	Toyota	3
9	98	Jake Garcia	ThorSport Racing	Ford	2
10	34	Layne Riggs	Front Row Motorsports	Ford	1

=== Final Stage results ===
Stage Three Laps: 120

Fin	St	#	Driver	Team	Make	Laps	Led	Status	Pts
1	15	62	Christopher Bell (i)	Halmar Friesen Racing	Toyota	250	63	Running	0
2	16	38	Chandler Smith	Front Row Motorsports	Ford	250	0	Running	35
3	10	17	Gio Ruggiero	Tricon Garage	Toyota	250	0	Running	38
4	11	45	Ross Chastain (i)	Niece Motorsports	Chevrolet	250	0	Running	0
5	2	91	Christian Eckes	McAnally–Hilgemann Racing	Chevrolet	250	132	Running	48
6	5	98	Jake Garcia	ThorSport Racing	Ford	250	0	Running	39
7	34	26	Dawson Sutton	Rackley W.A.R.	Chevrolet	250	0	Running	30
8	8	7	Kyle Busch (i)	Spire Motorsports	Chevrolet	250	39	Running	0
9	7	77	Carson Hocevar (i)	Spire Motorsports	Chevrolet	250	0	Running	0
10	28	12	Brenden Queen (R)	Kaulig Racing	Ram	250	0	Running	27
11	9	99	Ben Rhodes	ThorSport Racing	Ford	250	13	Running	43
12	23	19	Daniel Hemric	McAnally–Hilgemann Racing	Chevrolet	250	0	Running	25
13	20	18	Tyler Ankrum	McAnally–Hilgemann Racing	Chevrolet	250	0	Running	24
14	4	5	Chase Briscoe (i)	Tricon Garage	Toyota	250	0	Running	0
15	14	16	Justin Haley	Kaulig Racing	Ram	250	0	Running	30
16	13	52	Stewart Friesen	Halmar Friesen Racing	Toyota	250	0	Running	21
17	27	44	Andrés Pérez de Lara	Niece Motorsports	Chevrolet	250	0	Running	20
18	36	71	Daniel Suárez (i)	Spire Motorsports	Chevrolet	250	0	Running	0
19	26	14	Mini Tyrrell (R)	Kaulig Racing	Ram	250	0	Running	18
20	22	15	Tanner Gray	Tricon Garage	Toyota	250	0	Running	17
21	29	25	Carson Ferguson	Kaulig Racing	Ram	250	0	Running	16
22	3	34	Layne Riggs	Front Row Motorsports	Ford	249	0	Running	25
23	6	88	Ty Majeski	ThorSport Racing	Ford	248	0	Running	14
24	33	76	Spencer Boyd	Freedom Racing Enterprises	Chevrolet	247	0	Running	13
25	25	81	Kris Wright	McAnally–Hilgemann Racing	Chevrolet	247	0	Running	12
26	21	4	Ricky Stenhouse Jr. (i)	Niece Motorsports	Chevrolet	247	0	Running	0
27	18	9	Grant Enfinger	CR7 Motorsports	Chevrolet	243	0	Running	10
28	17	13	Cole Butcher (R)	ThorSport Racing	Ford	241	0	Running	9
29	19	10	Corey LaJoie	Kaulig Racing	Ram	214	0	Accident	12
30	12	1	Corey Heim	Tricon Garage	Toyota	179	1	Accident	14
31	1	11	Kaden Honeycutt	Tricon Garage	Toyota	179	2	Accident	17
32	30	2	Luke Baldwin	Team Reaume	Ford	178	0	Accident	5
33	35	56	Timmy Hill	Hill Motorsports	Toyota	120	0	Accident	4
34	24	42	Tyler Reif	Niece Motorsports	Chevrolet	117	0	Accident	3
35	31	33	Frankie Muniz	Team Reaume	Ford	115	0	Accident	2
36	32	22	Clayton Green	Team Reaume	Ford	103	0	Too Slow	1
Official race results

=== Race statistics ===
- Lead changes: 7 among 6 different drivers
- Cautions/Laps: 9 for 76 laps
- Red flags: 1
- Time of race: 1 hour, 59 minutes and 58 seconds
- Average speed: 66.644 miles per hour (107.253 km/h)

== Standings after the race ==
Drivers' Championship standings

	Pos	Driver	Points
3	1	Chandler Smith	208
	2	Kaden Honeycutt	207 (–1)
2	3	Corey Heim	204 (–4)
1	4	Layne Riggs	204 (–4)
2	5	Christian Eckes	191 (–17)
	6	Gio Ruggiero	187 (–21)
2	7	Ty Majeski	182 (–26)
	8	Ben Rhodes	181 (–27)
4	9	Jake Garcia	146 (–62)
	10	Justin Haley	144 (–64)
Official driver's standings

Manufacturers' Championship standings

Pos	Manufacturer	Points
1	Toyota	266
2	Ford	237 (–29)
3	Chevrolet	220 (–46)
4	Ram	168 (–98)

- Note: Only the first 10 positions are included for the driver standings.

Previous race: 2026 Black's Tire 200	NASCAR Craftsman Truck Series; 2026 season	Next race: 2026 SpeedyCash.com 250
