= Spencer Boyd =

American racing driver (born 1995)

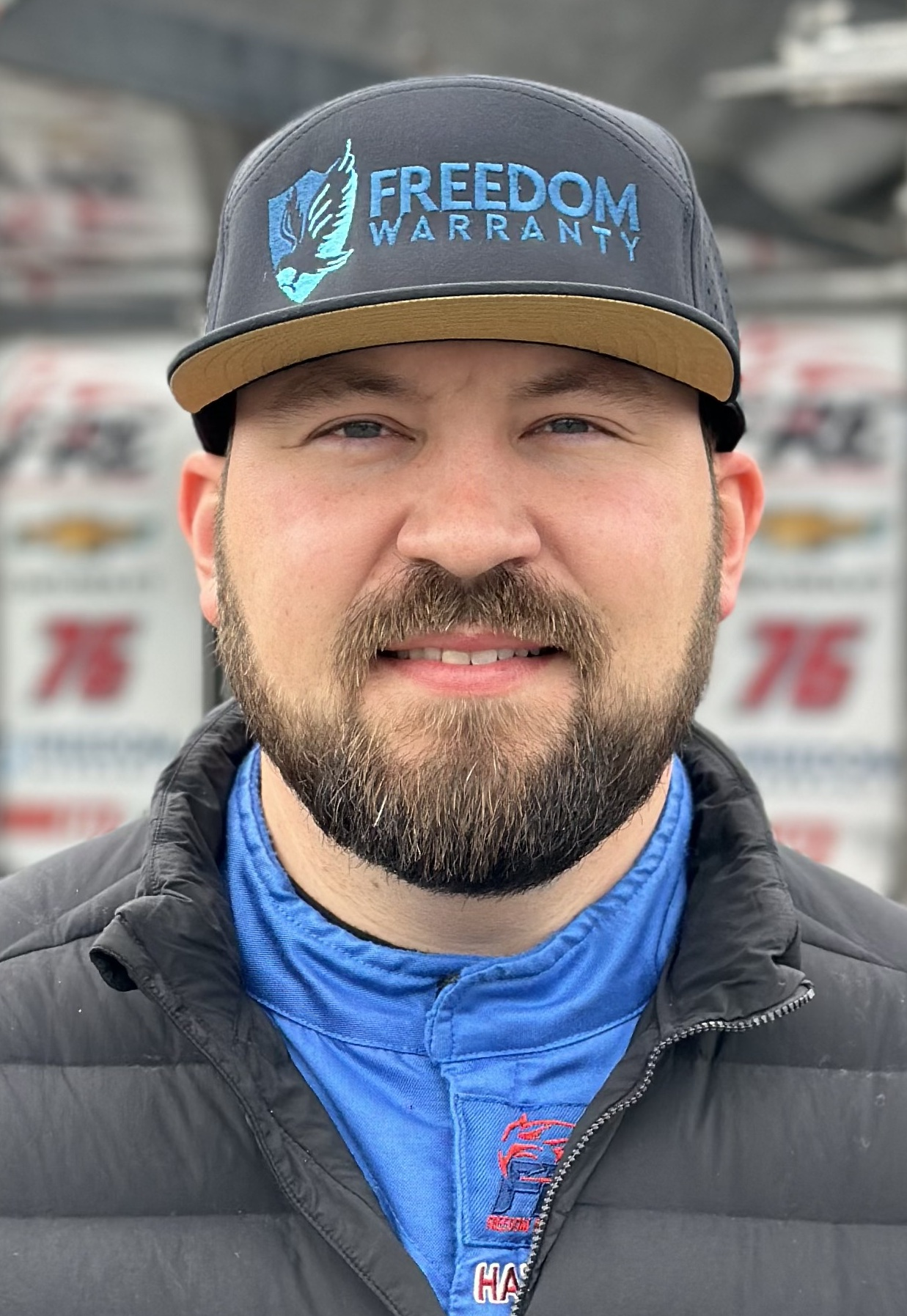
- Boyd at Las Vegas Motor Speedway in 2025
- Born: Spencer Paul Boyd; June 26, 1995 (age 31); Creve Coeur, Missouri, U.S.

NASCAR Cup Series career
- 3 races run over 1 year
- 2019 position: 63rd
- Best finish: 63rd (2019)
- First race: 2019 Consumers Energy 400 (Michigan)
- Last race: 2019 1000Bulbs.com 500 (Talladega)
Wins	Top tens	Poles
0	0	0

NASCAR O'Reilly Auto Parts Series career
- 50 races run over 4 years
- 2021 position: 97th
- Best finish: 26th (2018)
- First race: 2016 U.S. Cellular (Iowa)
- Last race: 2021 Dead On Tools 250 (Martinsville)
Wins	Top tens	Poles
0	0	0

NASCAR FedEx Freight Truck Series career
- 174 races run over 10 years
- Truck no., team: No. 76 (Freedom Racing Enterprises)
- 2026 position: 26th
- Best finish: 17th (2019)
- First race: 2016 Alpha Energy Solutions 250 (Martinsville)
- Last race: 2026 Craftsman 200 (Homestead)
- First win: 2019 Sugarlands Shine 250 (Talladega)
Wins	Top tens	Poles
1	6	0
- Statistics up to date as of November 6, 2026.

Spencer Paul Boyd (born June 26, 1995) is an American professional stock car racing driver and team owner. He competes part-time in the NASCAR Craftsman Truck Series, driving the No. 76 Chevrolet Silverado RST for Freedom Racing Enterprises, a team he co-owns with Chris Miller. Boyd has also previously competed in the NASCAR Cup Series and NASCAR Xfinity Series.

== Racing career ==
=== Early career ===
Starting at the age of four in dirt bike racing, Boyd moved up to go-karts a year later. In 2009, he moved up to Legends car racing at Charlotte Motor Speedway and Rockingham Speedway, winning championships at The Rock in 2011 and 2012. From there, Boyd moved up to Pro Trucks and limited late models at Hickory Motor Speedway.

=== Craftsman Truck Series ===
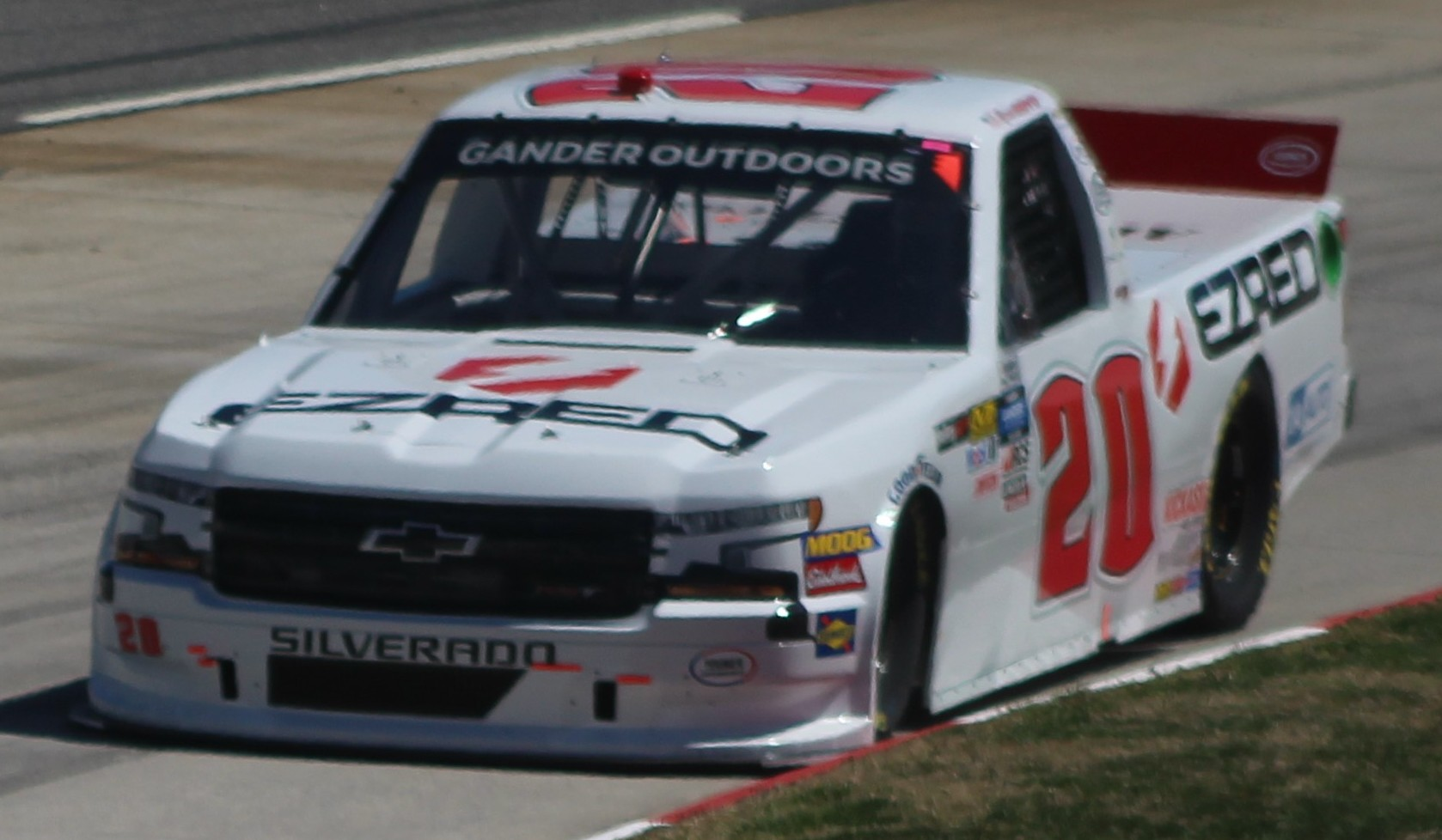
Boyd at Martinsville in March 2019

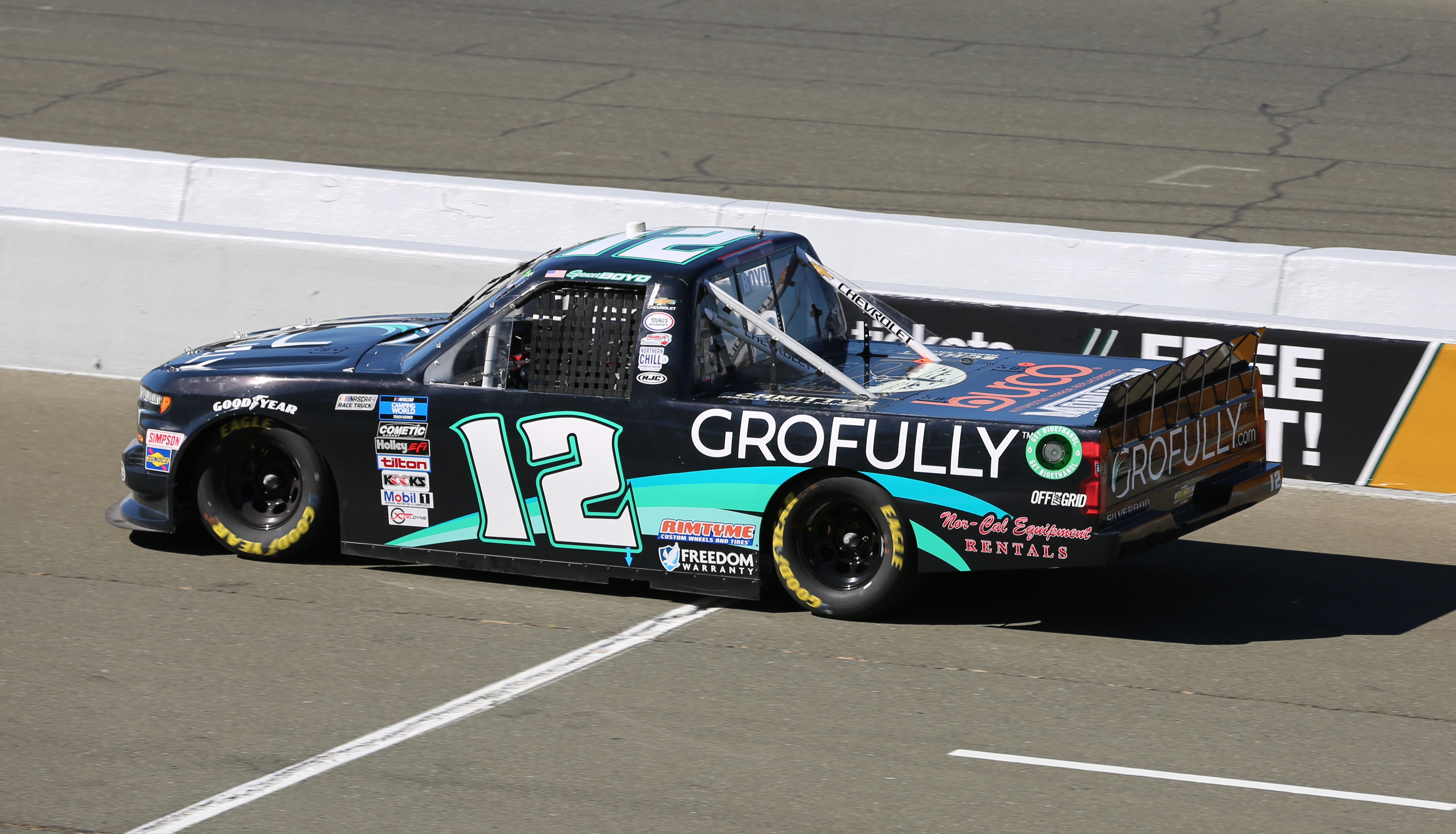
Boyd's No. 12 truck at Sonoma Raceway in 2022

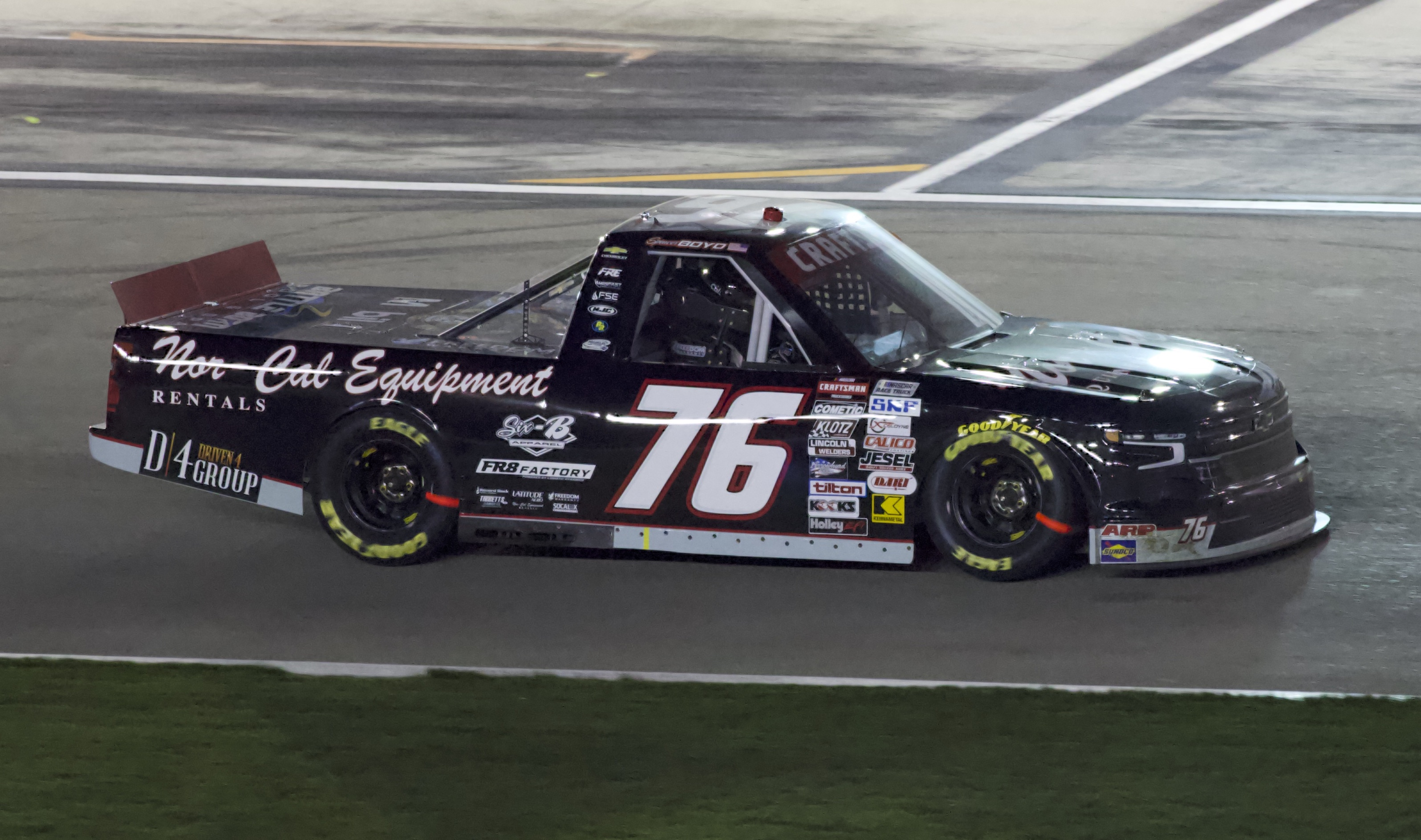
Boyd's No. 76 truck at Las Vegas Motor Speedway in 2024.

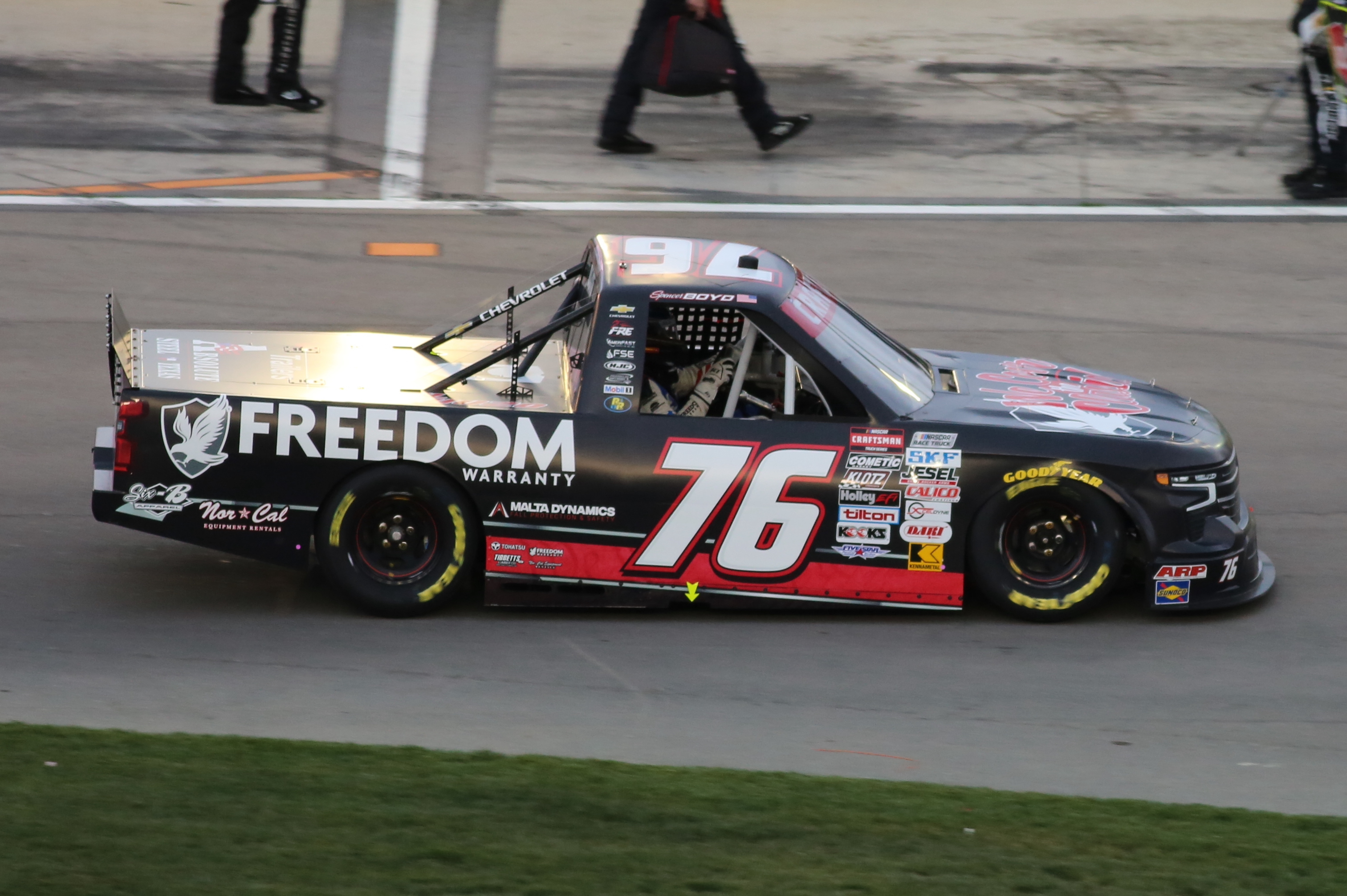
Boyd's No. 76 truck at Las Vegas Motor Speedway in 2025

Boyd debuted in 2016, driving for MB Motorsports at Martinsville Speedway. A crash hampered his efforts, and he finished 28th. Six races later at Gateway Motorsports Park, he drove Premium Motorsports' No. 49 truck to a top-twenty finish (nineteenth). He then returned to the series for the Ford EcoBoost 300, driving MAKE Motorsports' No. 50 truck.

Boyd joined Rick Ware Racing's Truck Series team in 2017, splitting the No. 12 truck with Cody Ware. He failed to qualify at Daytona International Speedway but finished twentieth in his next attempt, at Kansas Speedway. He was shuffled to Beaver Motorsports' No. 50 the following week, and finished twentieth again. With the disbanding of RWR's Truck operation, the rest of his scheduled starts did not happen. However, Boyd did run the Fred's 250 at Talladega Superspeedway with Copp Motorsports, running as high as fourth before getting caught up in a last-lap wreck to finish thirteenth.

After not starting a single truck race in 2018, it was announced on January 7, 2019, that Boyd would pilot the No. 20 Chevrolet Silverado for Young's Motorsports full-time in 2019. In the season-opening race, the 2019 NextEra Energy 250, Boyd avoided near-ubiquitous attrition to capture his first top-ten result in fourth. At Kentucky Speedway in July, Boyd was involved in an on-track incident with Natalie Decker, eliminating both drivers from the race. The situation later boiled over into the truck garage, culminating in Decker taking Boyd's hat off his head and slamming it on the ground before being verbally warned by a NASCAR official and escorted away by her team. On July 30, days before the Eldora Dirt Derby, Boyd announced he would withdraw from the race due to back pain that was exacerbated when he decided to compete in the previous week's Gander RV 150 at Pocono against his doctor's suggestions. Landon Huffman replaced him in the No. 20 for Eldora.

Boyd won his first career NASCAR race in the 2019 Sugarlands Shine 250 at Talladega Superspeedway on October 12, 2019. After crossing the finish line second behind Johnny Sauter, Boyd was declared the winner by NASCAR after the conclusion of the race, after Sauter was penalized for both blocking Riley Herbst below the inside yellow line and driving his truck below the inside yellow line. Boyd noted that the win was special, as he only secured enough sponsorship to run that race a couple of weeks before the event.

Boyd returned to a full-time Truck schedule with Young's in 2020.

In 2021, dirt-track racer Kyle Strickler replaced Boyd in the Corn Belt 150. That year, he would make starts for Jimmy Means Racing and DGM Racing in the Xfinity Series, respectively.

During the 2022 season, Boyd suffered a dislocated shoulder in a last lap crash at Las Vegas.

Boyd returned to Young's Motorsports in 2023, driving the No. 12 truck full-time. He failed to qualify for the season opener at Daytona and struggled throughout the season, only scoring one top-20 finish. He also failed to qualify for the races at Talladega and Phoenix. Boyd parted ways with the team at season's end.

In 2024, Boyd drove the No. 76 Chevrolet Silverado for the newly formed Freedom Racing Enterprises, a team he co-owns with Chris Miller. Boyd began the season on a high note, finishing fifth at Daytona, but struggled with consistency throughout the rest of the season, scoring just three more finishes of twentieth or better and only one additional top-ten. He ended the season 25th in the standings.

Boyd returned to the No. 76 truck in 2025, starting the season with a nineteenth-place finish at Daytona. He scored eleven top-20 finishes and finished 21st in the standings, four spots higher than the previous year.

=== Xfinity Series ===
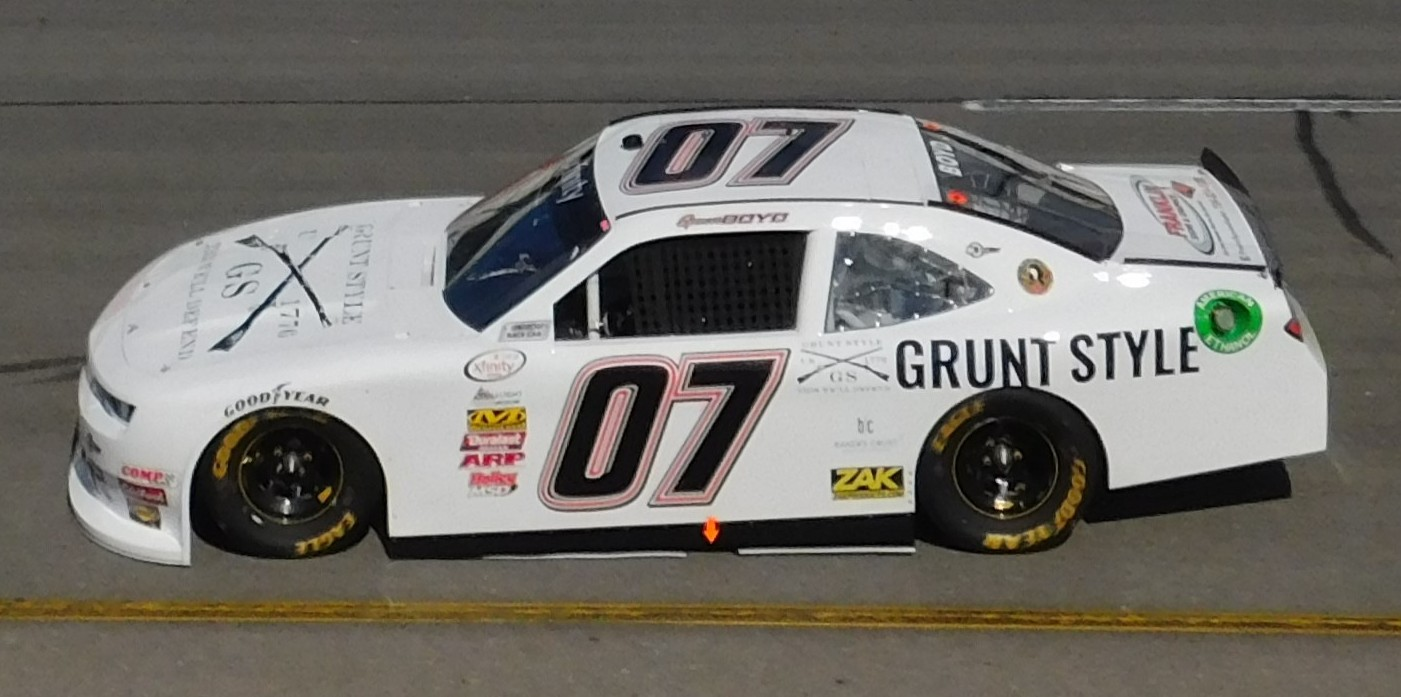
Boyd in the No. 07 at Richmond in September 2017

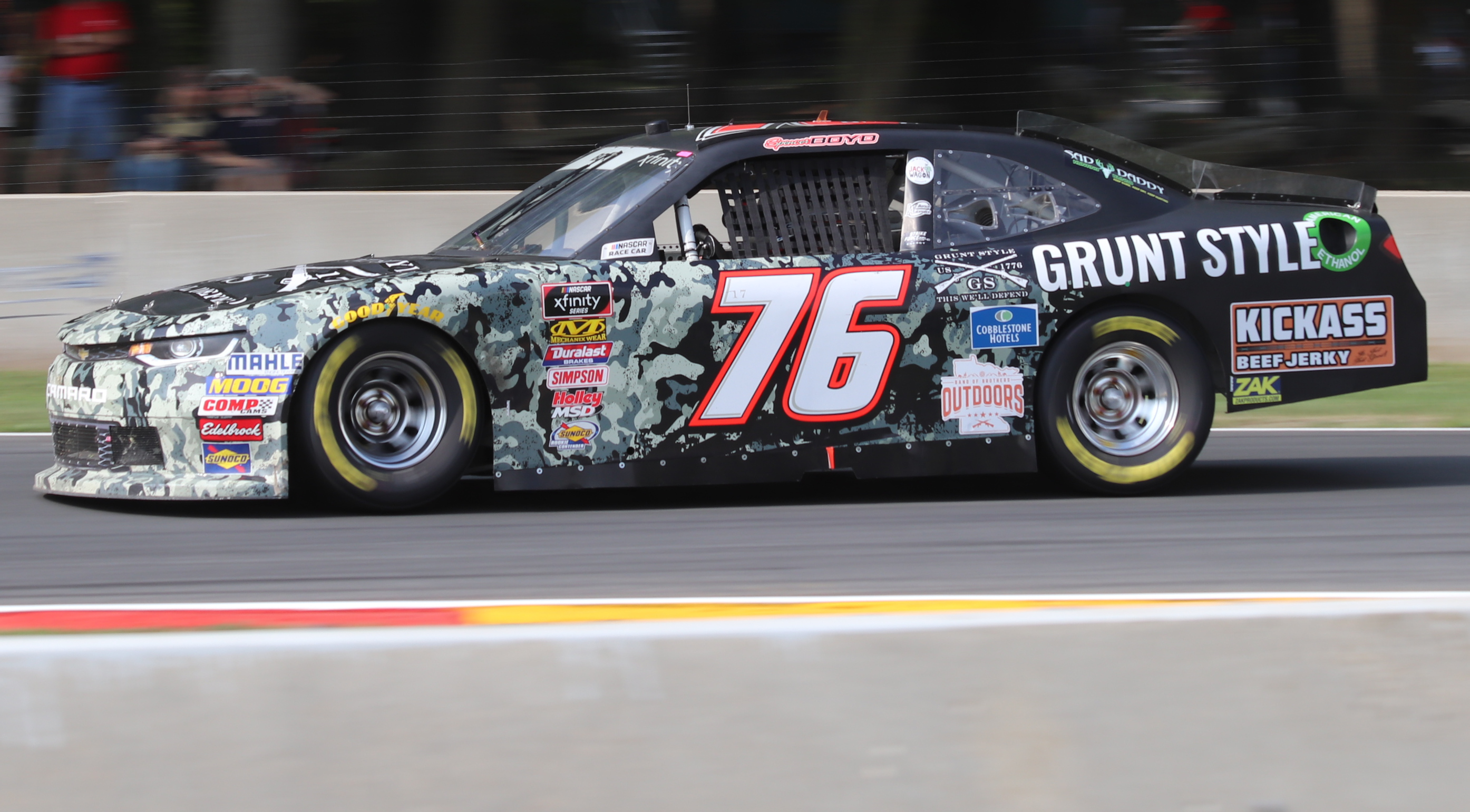
Boyd in the No. 76 at Road America in 2018

Boyd debuted in 2016, driving for Rick Ware Racing at Iowa Speedway. Starting last in the 40-car field, he improved eleven positions during the race to finish sixteen laps down in 29th. Boyd then signed on with Obaika Racing, driving the No. 77 to a 35th-place finish at Chicagoland Speedway. On June 5, 2017, it was announced that Boyd would run multiple races in the 2017 NASCAR Xfinity Series season for SS-Green Light Racing, replacing normal driver Ray Black Jr. The deal with SS-Green Light was contingent on sponsorship; running with funding from Grunt Style. In October 2017, it was announced that Boyd would compete full-time in 2018, driving the No. 76 Chevrolet for SS-Green Light Racing. The early part of the season brought some struggles, but the team improved in summer, with a best finish of seventeenth in the summer Daytona race. Boyd finished the year 26th in points.

=== Cup Series ===
On August 7, 2019, it was announced that Boyd was set to make his Monster Energy NASCAR Cup Series career debut in that weekend's race at Michigan International Speedway. The ride would come in the No. 53 for Rick Ware Racing, a team Boyd has previously driven for in the Xfinity and Truck Series.

== Personal life ==
Boyd attended Strayer University after graduating Rowan-Cabarrus Community College. He initially attended Jay M. Robinson High School before finishing high school online due to a heavy racing schedule. Before becoming a full-time NASCAR driver, Boyd sold cars in Concord, North Carolina.

== Motorsports career results ==
=== Racing career summary ===
Season	Series	Team	Races	Wins	Top 5	Top 10	Points	Position
2016	NASCAR Camping World Truck Series	MB Motorsports	1	0	0	0	22	51st
2016	NASCAR Camping World Truck Series	Premium Motorsports	1	0	0	0	22	51st
2016	NASCAR Camping World Truck Series	MAKE Motorsports	1	0	0	0	22	51st
2016	NASCAR Xfinity Series	Rick Ware Racing	1	0	0	0	0	NC†
2016	NASCAR Xfinity Series	Obaika Racing	1	0	0	0	0	NC†
2017	NASCAR Camping World Truck Series	Rick Ware Racing	1	0	0	0	0	NC†
2017	NASCAR Camping World Truck Series	Beaver Motorsports	1	0	0	0	0	NC†
2017	NASCAR Camping World Truck Series	Copp Motorsports	1	0	0	0	0	NC†
2017	NASCAR Xfinity Series	SS-Greenlight Racing	6	0	0	0	41	48th
2018	NASCAR Xfinity Series	SS-Greenlight Racing	33	0	0	0	302	26th
2019	NASCAR Gander Outdoors Truck Series	Young's Motorsports	18	1	2	2	338	17th
2019	Monster Energy NASCAR Cup Series	Rick Ware Racing	3	0	0	0	0	NC†
2020	NASCAR Gander Outdoors Truck Series	Young's Motorsports	23	0	0	0	306	20th
2021	NASCAR Camping World Truck Series	Young's Motorsports	20	0	0	1	237	24th
2021	NASCAR Xfinity Series	Jimmy Means Racing	4	0	0	0	0	NC†
2021	NASCAR Xfinity Series	DGM Racing	5	0	0	0	0	NC†
2022	NASCAR Camping World Truck Series	Young's Motorsports	22	0	0	0	207	28th
2023	NASCAR Craftsman Truck Series	Young's Motorsports	20	0	0	0	165	28th
2024	NASCAR Craftsman Truck Series	Freedom Racing Enterprises	23	0	1	2	267	25th
2025	NASCAR Craftsman Truck Series	Freedom Racing Enterprises	25	0	0	0	374	21st
2026	NASCAR Craftsman Truck Series	Freedom Racing Enterprises	18	0	0	1	206	26th

^{†} As Boyd was a guest driver, he was ineligible for championship points.

=== NASCAR ===
(key) (Bold – Pole position awarded by qualifying time. Italics – Pole position earned by points standings or practice time. * – Most laps led.)

==== Monster Energy Cup Series ====
Monster Energy NASCAR Cup Series results
Year	Team	No.	Make	1	2	3	4	5	6	7	8	9	10	11	12	13	14	15	16	17	18	19	20	21	22	23	24	25	26	27	28	29	30	31	32	33	34	35	36	MENCC	Pts	Ref
2019	Rick Ware Racing	53	Ford	DAY	ATL	LVS	PHO	CAL	MAR	TEX	BRI	RCH	TAL	DOV	KAN	CLT	POC	MCH	SON	CHI	DAY	KEN	NHA	POC	GLN	MCH; 38	BRI	DAR	IND	LVS										63rd	0^{1}	
2019	Rick Ware Racing	53	Chevy																												RCH; 34	ROV	DOV							63rd	0^{1}	
2019	Rick Ware Racing	52	Chevy																															TAL; 40	KAN	MAR	TEX	PHO	HOM	63rd	0^{1}	

==== Xfinity Series ====
NASCAR Xfinity Series results
Year	Team	No.	Make	1	2	3	4	5	6	7	8	9	10	11	12	13	14	15	16	17	18	19	20	21	22	23	24	25	26	27	28	29	30	31	32	33	NXSC	Pts	Ref
2016	Rick Ware Racing	25	Chevy	DAY	ATL	LVS	PHO	CAL	TEX	BRI	RCH	TAL	DOV	CLT	POC	MCH	IOW	DAY	KEN	NHA	IND	IOW; 29	GLN	MOH	BRI	ROA	DAR	RCH									122nd	0^{1}	
2016	Obaika Racing	77	Chevy																										CHI; 35	KEN	DOV	CLT	KAN	TEX	PHO	HOM	122nd	0^{1}	
2017	SS-Green Light Racing	07	Chevy	DAY	ATL	LVS	PHO	CAL	TEX	BRI	RCH	TAL	CLT	DOV	POC; 33	MCH	IOW	DAY	KEN	NHA; 27	IND	IOW	GLN	MOH	BRI	ROA	DAR	RCH; 31	CHI; 28	KEN	DOV	CLT	KAN; 33	TEX; 29	PHO	HOM	48th	41	
2018	SS-Green Light Racing	76	Chevy	DAY; 25	ATL; 29	LVS; 36	PHO; 30	CAL; 30	TEX; 25	BRI; 25	RCH; 28	TAL; 40	DOV; 30	CLT; 21	POC; 28	MCH; 22	IOW; 22	CHI; 29	DAY; 17	KEN; 24	NHA; 24	IOW; 23	GLN; 24	MOH; 25	BRI; 25	ROA; 21	DAR; 31	IND; 36	LVS; 22	RCH; 33	ROV; 29	DOV; 32	KAN; 19	TEX; 25	PHO; 28	HOM; 30	26th	302	
2021	Jimmy Means Racing	52	Chevy	DAY	DRC	HOM	LVS	PHO	ATL	MAR	TAL	DAR	DOV	COA	CLT	MOH	TEX	NSH	POC	ROA	ATL	NHA; 33	GLN	IRC	MCH	DAY; 38	DAR					ROV; 31			MAR; 30		97th	0^{1}	
2021	DGM Racing	90	Chevy																									RCH; 33	BRI; 31	LVS; 25	TAL		TEX; 28	KAN; 31		PHO; DNQ	97th	0^{1}	

==== Craftsman Truck Series ====
NASCAR Craftsman Truck Series results
Year	Team	No.	Make	1	2	3	4	5	6	7	8	9	10	11	12	13	14	15	16	17	18	19	20	21	22	23	24	25	NCTC	Pts	Ref
2016	MB Motorsports	63	Ram	DAY	ATL	MAR; 28	KAN	DOV	CLT	TEX	IOW																		51st	22	
2016	Premium Motorsports	49	Chevy									GTW; 19	KEN	ELD	POC	BRI	MCH	MSP	CHI	NHA	LVS	TAL	MAR	TEX	PHO				51st	22	
2016	MAKE Motorsports	50	Chevy																							HOM; 30			51st	22	
2017	Rick Ware Racing	12	Chevy	DAY; DNQ	ATL	MAR	KAN; 20																						86th	0^{1}	
2017	Beaver Motorsports	50	Chevy					CLT; 20	DOV	TEX	GTW	IOW	KEN	ELD	POC	MCH	BRI	MSP	CHI	NHA	LVS								86th	0^{1}	
2017	Copp Motorsports	83	Chevy																			TAL; 13	MAR	TEX	PHO	HOM			86th	0^{1}	
2019	Young's Motorsports	20	Chevy	DAY; 4	ATL; 25	LVS; 29	MAR; 27	TEX; 11	DOV; 22	KAN; 17	CLT; 22	TEX; 23	IOW; 16	GTW; 20	CHI; 17	KEN; 29	POC; 18	ELD	MCH; 22	BRI	MSP	LVS; 20	TAL; 1	MAR; 15	PHO	HOM			17th	338	
2020	Young's Motorsports	20	Chevy	DAY; 19	LVS; 25	CLT; 25	ATL; 27	HOM; 22	POC; 22	KEN; 38	TEX; 24	KAN; 23	KAN; 18	MCH; 27	DRC; 17	DOV; 28	GTW; 25	DAR; 26	RCH; 20	BRI; 27	LVS; 28	TAL; 38	KAN; 22	TEX; 14	MAR; 15	PHO; 27			20th	306	
2021	Young's Motorsports	20	Chevy	DAY; 13	DRC; 39	LVS; 22	ATL; 33	BRD; 25	RCH; 27	KAN; 35	DAR; 22	COA; DNQ	CLT; 26	TEX; 27	NSH; DNQ	POC; 27	KNX	GLN; 33	GTW; 16	DAR; 21	BRI; 31	LVS; 19	TAL; 7	MAR; 15	PHO; 31				24th	237	
2022	Young's Motorsports	12	Chevy	DAY; 11	LVS; 27	ATL; 20	COA; 23	MAR; 33	BRD; 24	DAR; 24	KAN; 31	TEX; 28	CLT; 24	GTW; 31	SON; 23	KNX; 29	NSH; 25	MOH; 16	POC; 32	IRP; 36	RCH; 32	KAN; 33	BRI; 36	TAL; DNQ	HOM; 36	PHO; 33			28th	207	
2023	Young's Motorsports	12	Chevy	DAY; DNQ	LVS; 23	ATL; 21	COA; 32	TEX; 22	BRD; 16	MAR; 23	KAN; 26	DAR; 33	NWS; 27	CLT; 31	GTW; 26	NSH; 25	MOH; 25	POC; 25	RCH; 35	IRP; 33	MLW; 32	KAN; 31	BRI; 31	TAL; DNQ	HOM; 33	PHO; DNQ			28th	165	
2024	Freedom Racing Enterprises	76	Chevy	DAY; 5	ATL; 22	LVS; 29	BRI; 30	COA; 30	MAR; 25	TEX; 27	KAN; 31	DAR; 19	NWS; 32	CLT; 20	GTW; 26	NSH; 22	POC; 36	IRP; 34	RCH; 24	MLW; 28	BRI; 29	KAN; 28	TAL; 10	HOM; 27	MAR; 22	PHO; 28			25th	267	
2025	Freedom Racing Enterprises	76	Chevy	DAY; 19	ATL; 19	LVS; 25	HOM; 28	MAR; 17	BRI; 30	CAR; 15	TEX; 15	KAN; 23	NWS; 28	CLT; 24	NSH; 26	MCH; 16	POC; 25	LRP; 31	IRP; 24	GLN; 18	RCH; 28	DAR; 23	BRI; 27	NHA; 21	ROV; 20	TAL; 15	MAR; 17	PHO; 17	21st	374	
2026	Freedom Racing Enterprises	76	Chevy	DAY; 21	ATL; 26	STP	DAR; 30	CAR; 28	BRI; 24	TEX; 20	GLN	DOV; 22	CLT; 25	NSH; 26	MCH; 34	COR	LRP	NWS	IRP; 28	RCH; 34	NHA; 36	BRI	KAN; 20	CLT; 24	PHO	TAL; 9	MAR; 23	HOM; 30	26th	206	

^{*} Season still in progress
^{1} Ineligible for series points
