= 2026 Allegiance 200 =

NASCAR Craftsman Truck Series race at Nashville Superspeedway

Race details
- Race 11 of 25 in the 2026 NASCAR Craftsman Truck Series
- Date: May 29, 2026
- Location: Nashville Superspeedway in Lebanon, Tennessee
- Course: Permanent racing facility
- Course length: 1.333 miles (2.145 km)
- Distance: 150 laps, 199.95 mi (321.788 km)
- Average speed: 99.958 miles per hour (160.867 km/h)

Pole position
Driver	Layne Riggs	Front Row Motorsports
- Grid positions set by competition-based formula

Most laps led
Driver	Layne Riggs	Front Row Motorsports
- Laps: 99

Fastest lap
Driver	Layne Riggs	Front Row Motorsports
- Time: 29.794

Winner
No. 34	Layne Riggs	Front Row Motorsports

Television in the United States
- Network: FS1
- Announcers: Jamie Little, Michael Waltrip and Joey Logano

Radio in the United States
- Radio: NRN
- Booth announcers: Brad Gillie and Nick Yeoman
- Turn announcers: Andrew Kurland (1 & 2) and Pat Patterson (3 & 4)

The 2026 Allegiance 200 was a NASCAR Craftsman Truck Series race held on Friday, May 29, 2026, at Nashville Superspeedway in Lebanon, Tennessee. Contested over 150 laps on the 1 1/3-mile (2.146 km) speedway, it was the eleventh race of the 2026 NASCAR Craftsman Truck Series season, and the sixth running of the event.

Layne Riggs, driving for Front Row Motorsports, pulled off a dominating performance, sweeping the stages and leading a race-high 99 laps, holding off Rajah Caruth and Chandler Smith in a thrilling finish to earn his 8th career NASCAR Craftsman Truck Series win, his third of the season, and his second consecutive win. Caruth finished second, and Smith finished third. Ross Chastain and Tyler Ankrum rounded out the top five, while Stewart Friesen, Grant Enfinger, Christian Eckes, Gio Ruggiero, and Daniel Dye rounded out the top ten.

== Report ==
=== Background ===
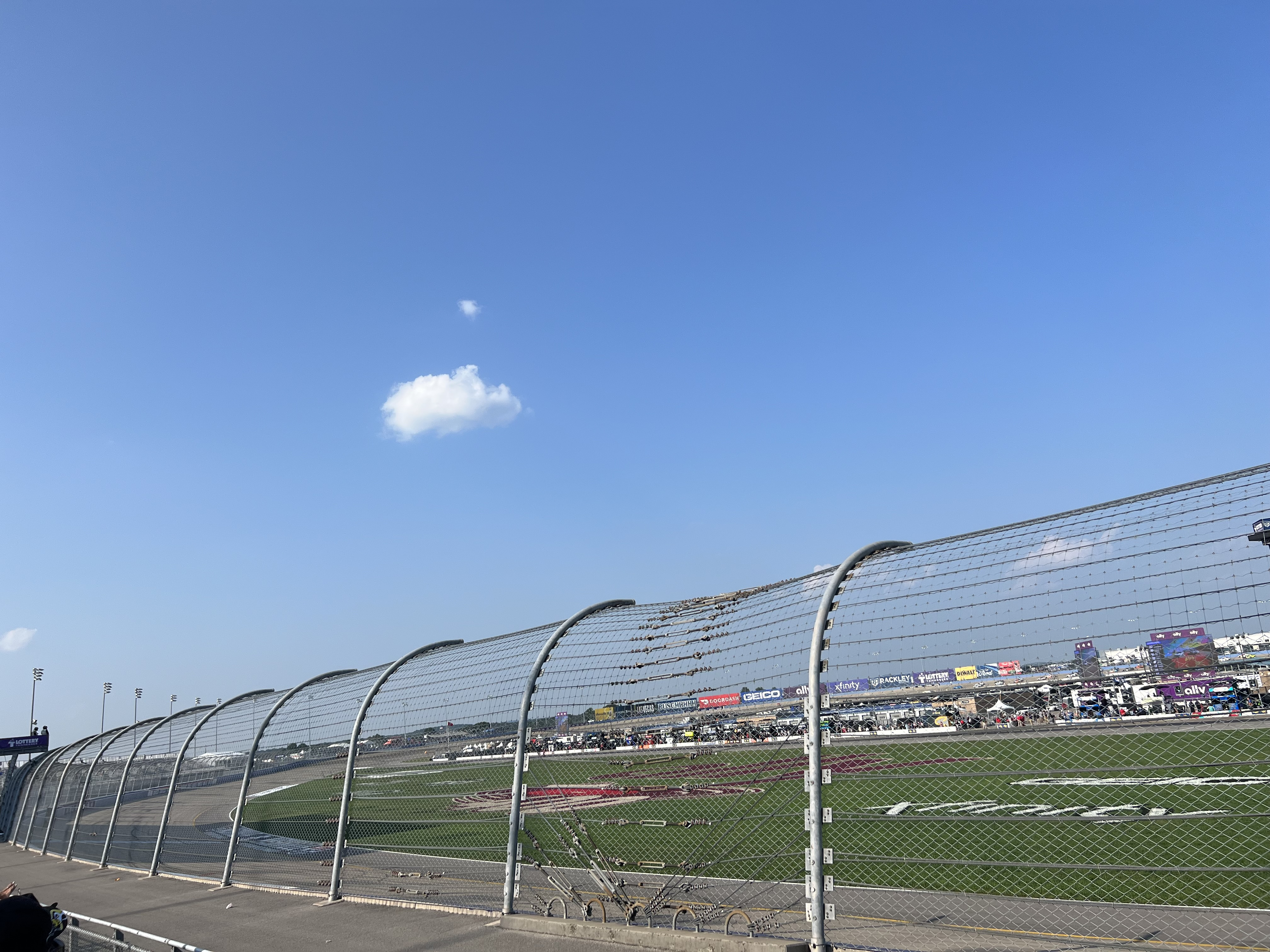
Nashville Superspeedway, the track where the race was held.

Nashville Superspeedway is a motor racing complex located in Lebanon, Tennessee, United States, about 30 miles (48 km) southeast of Nashville. The track was built in 2001 and is currently used for events, driving schools and GT Academy, a reality television competition.

It is a concrete oval track 1 1/3 miles (2.146 km) long. Nashville Superspeedway is owned by Dover Motorsports, Inc., which also owns Dover International Speedway. Nashville Superspeedway was the longest concrete oval in NASCAR during the time it was on the NASCAR Xfinity Series and NASCAR Craftsman Truck Series circuits. Current permanent seating capacity is approximately 25,000. Additional portable seats are brought in for some events, and seating capacity can be expanded to 150,000. Infrastructure is in place to expand the facility to include a short track, drag strip, and road course.

Flote.com was originally the new title sponsor on December 3, 2025, replacing Rackley Roofing but on May 15, 2026, Allegiance Flag Supply was named the new title sponsor.

==== Entry list ====
- (R) denotes rookie driver.
- (i) denotes driver who is ineligible for series driver points.

#	Driver	Team	Make
1	Brandon Jones (i)	Tricon Garage	Toyota
2	Clayton Green	Team Reaume	Ford
4	Stefan Parsons	Niece Motorsports	Chevrolet
5	William Sawalich (i)	Tricon Garage	Toyota
7 (Note: previously scheduled to be Kyle Busch)	Rajah Caruth (i)	Spire Motorsports	Chevrolet
9	Grant Enfinger	CR7 Motorsports	Chevrolet
10	Corey LaJoie	Kaulig Racing	Ram
11	Kaden Honeycutt	Tricon Garage	Toyota
12	Brenden Queen (R)	Kaulig Racing	Ram
13	Cole Butcher (R)	ThorSport Racing	Ford
14	Mini Tyrrell (R)	Kaulig Racing	Ram
15	Tanner Gray	Tricon Garage	Toyota
16	Justin Haley	Kaulig Racing	Ram
17	Gio Ruggiero	Tricon Garage	Toyota
18	Tyler Ankrum	McAnally–Hilgemann Racing	Chevrolet
19	Daniel Hemric	McAnally–Hilgemann Racing	Chevrolet
20	Daniel Dye	McAnally–Hilgemann Racing	Chevrolet
22	Derek Lemke	Team Reaume	Ford
25	Carson Ferguson	Kaulig Racing	Ram
26	Dawson Sutton	Rackley W.A.R.	Chevrolet
27	Toni Breidinger	Rackley W.A.R.	Chevrolet
33	Frankie Muniz	Team Reaume	Ford
34	Layne Riggs	Front Row Motorsports	Ford
38	Chandler Smith	Front Row Motorsports	Ford
42	Tyler Reif	Niece Motorsports	Chevrolet
44	Andrés Pérez de Lara	Niece Motorsports	Chevrolet
45	Ross Chastain (i)	Niece Motorsports	Chevrolet
52	Stewart Friesen	Halmar Friesen Racing	Toyota
62	Parker Retzlaff (i)	Halmar Friesen Racing	Toyota
69	Jonathan Shafer	MBM Motorsports	Ford
76	Spencer Boyd	Freedom Racing Enterprises	Chevrolet
77	Jesse Love (i)	Spire Motorsports	Chevrolet
81	Kris Wright	McAnally–Hilgemann Racing	Chevrolet
88	Ty Majeski	ThorSport Racing	Ford
91	Christian Eckes	McAnally–Hilgemann Racing	Chevrolet
98	Jake Garcia	ThorSport Racing	Ford
99	Ben Rhodes	ThorSport Racing	Ford
Official entry list

== Practice ==
The first and only practice session was held on Friday, May 29, at 3:00 PM CST, and lasted for 50 minutes.

Layne Riggs, driving for Front Row Motorsports, set the fastest time in the session, with a lap of 29.189 seconds, and a speed of 164.034 miles per hour (263.987 km/h).

=== Practice results ===
Pos.	#	Driver	Team	Make	Time	Speed
1	34	Layne Riggs	Front Row Motorsports	Ford	29.189	164.034
2	98	Jake Garcia	ThorSport Racing	Ford	29.487	162.377
3	9	Grant Enfinger	CR7 Motorsports	Chevrolet	29.493	162.344
Full practice results

== Starting lineup ==
Qualifying was originally scheduled to be held on Friday, May 29, at 4:05 PM CST, but after 24 trucks made a lap, the rest of the session was cancelled due to inclement weather. Layne Riggs, driving for Front Row Motorsports, was awarded the pole position as a result of NASCAR's pandemic formula with a score of 1.300.

Two drivers failed to qualify: Toni Breidinger and Jonathan Shafer.

=== Starting lineup ===
Pos.	#	Driver	Team	Make
1	34	Layne Riggs	Front Row Motorsports	Ford
2	11	Kaden Honeycutt	Tricon Garage	Toyota
3	77	Jesse Love (i)	Spire Motorsports	Chevrolet
4	17	Gio Ruggiero	Tricon Garage	Toyota
5	91	Christian Eckes	McAnally–Hilgemann Racing	Chevrolet
6	99	Ben Rhodes	ThorSport Racing	Ford
7	1	Brandon Jones (i)	Tricon Garage	Toyota
8	5	William Sawalich (i)	Tricon Garage	Toyota
9	15	Tanner Gray	Tricon Garage	Toyota
10	19	Daniel Hemric	McAnally–Hilgemann Racing	Chevrolet
11	98	Jake Garcia	ThorSport Racing	Ford
12	10	Corey LaJoie	Kaulig Racing	Ram
13	4	Stefan Parsons	Niece Motorsports	Chevrolet
14	42	Tyler Reif	Niece Motorsports	Chevrolet
15	16	Justin Haley	Kaulig Racing	Ram
16	9	Grant Enfinger	CR7 Motorsports	Chevrolet
17	18	Tyler Ankrum	McAnally–Hilgemann Racing	Chevrolet
18	62	Parker Retzlaff (i)	Halmar Friesen Racing	Toyota
19	44	Andrés Pérez de Lara	Niece Motorsports	Chevrolet
20	25	Carson Ferguson	Kaulig Racing	Ram
21	45	Ross Chastain (i)	Niece Motorsports	Chevrolet
22	38	Chandler Smith	Front Row Motorsports	Ford
23	26	Dawson Sutton	Rackley W.A.R.	Chevrolet
24	52	Stewart Friesen	Halmar Friesen Racing	Toyota
25	7	Rajah Caruth (i)	Spire Motorsports	Chevrolet
26	33	Frankie Muniz	Team Reaume	Ford
27	88	Ty Majeski	ThorSport Racing	Ford
28	76	Spencer Boyd	Freedom Racing Enterprises	Chevrolet
29	13	Cole Butcher (R)	ThorSport Racing	Ford
30	12	Brenden Queen (R)	Kaulig Racing	Ram
31	22	Derek Lemke	Team Reaume	Ford
Qualified by owner's points
32	81	Kris Wright	McAnally–Hilgemann Racing	Chevrolet
33	14	Mini Tyrrell (R)	Kaulig Racing	Ram
34	2	Clayton Green	Team Reaume	Ford
35	93	Caleb Costner	Costner Motorsports	Chevrolet
36	20	Daniel Dye	McAnally–Hilgemann Racing	Chevrolet
Failed to qualify
37	27	Toni Breidinger	Rackley W.A.R.	Chevrolet
38	69	Jonathan Shafer	MBM Motorsports	Ford
Official starting lineup

== Race ==
=== Race results ===
==== Stage results ====
Stage One Laps: 45

Pos.	#	Driver	Team	Make	Pts
1	34	Layne Riggs	Front Row Motorsports	Ford	10
2	11	Kaden Honeycutt	Tricon Garage	Toyota	9
3	77	Jesse Love (i)	Spire Motorsports	Chevrolet	0
4	91	Christian Eckes	McAnally–Hilgemann Racing	Chevrolet	7
5	17	Gio Ruggiero	Tricon Garage	Toyota	6
6	38	Chandler Smith	Front Row Motorsports	Ford	5
7	99	Ben Rhodes	ThorSport Racing	Ford	4
8	15	Tanner Gray	Tricon Garage	Toyota	3
9	98	Jake Garcia	ThorSport Racing	Ford	2
10	19	Daniel Hemric	McAnally–Hilgemann Racing	Chevrolet	1

Stage Two Laps: 50

Pos.	#	Driver	Team	Make	Pts
1	34	Layne Riggs	Front Row Motorsports	Ford	10
2	11	Kaden Honeycutt	Tricon Garage	Toyota	9
3	38	Chandler Smith	Front Row Motorsports	Ford	8
4	91	Christian Eckes	McAnally–Hilgemann Racing	Chevrolet	7
5	9	Grant Enfinger	CR7 Motorsports	Chevrolet	6
6	99	Ben Rhodes	ThorSport Racing	Ford	5
7	20	Daniel Dye	McAnally–Hilgemann Racing	Chevrolet	4
8	88	Ty Majeski	ThorSport Racing	Ford	3
9	19	Daniel Hemric	McAnally–Hilgemann Racing	Chevrolet	2
10	45	Ross Chastain (i)	Niece Motorsports	Chevrolet	0

=== Final Stage results ===
Stage Three Laps: 55

Fin	St	#	Driver	Team	Make	Laps	Led	Status	Pts
1	1	34	Layne Riggs	Front Row Motorsports	Ford	150	99	Running	76
2	25	7	Rajah Caruth (i)	Spire Motorsports	Chevrolet	150	44	Running	0
3	22	38	Chandler Smith	Front Row Motorsports	Ford	150	0	Running	47
4	21	45	Ross Chastain (i)	Niece Motorsports	Chevrolet	150	7	Running	0
5	17	18	Tyler Ankrum	McAnally–Hilgemann Racing	Chevrolet	150	0	Running	32
6	24	52	Stewart Friesen	Halmar Friesen Racing	Toyota	150	0	Running	31
7	16	9	Grant Enfinger	CR7 Motorsports	Chevrolet	150	0	Running	36
8	5	91	Christian Eckes	McAnally–Hilgemann Racing	Chevrolet	150	0	Running	43
9	4	17	Gio Ruggiero	Tricon Garage	Toyota	150	0	Running	34
10	36	20	Daniel Dye	McAnally–Hilgemann Racing	Chevrolet	150	0	Running	31
11	18	62	Parker Retzlaff (i)	Halmar Friesen Racing	Toyota	150	0	Running	0
12	27	88	Ty Majeski	ThorSport Racing	Ford	150	0	Running	28
13	7	1	Brandon Jones (i)	Tricon Garage	Toyota	150	0	Running	0
14	19	44	Andrés Pérez de Lara	Niece Motorsports	Chevrolet	150	0	Running	23
15	10	19	Daniel Hemric	McAnally–Hilgemann Racing	Chevrolet	150	0	Running	25
16	29	13	Cole Butcher (R)	ThorSport Racing	Ford	150	0	Running	21
17	23	26	Dawson Sutton	Rackley W.A.R.	Chevrolet	150	0	Running	20
18	13	4	Stefan Parsons	Niece Motorsports	Chevrolet	150	0	Running	19
19	30	12	Brenden Queen (R)	Kaulig Racing	Ram	150	0	Running	18
20	33	14	Mini Tyrrell (R)	Kaulig Racing	Ram	150	0	Running	17
21	31	22	Derek Lemke	Team Reaume	Ford	150	0	Running	16
22	12	10	Corey LaJoie	Kaulig Racing	Ram	149	0	Running	15
23	32	81	Kris Wright	McAnally–Hilgemann Racing	Chevrolet	149	0	Running	14
24	26	33	Frankie Muniz	Team Reaume	Ford	149	0	Running	13
25	35	93	Caleb Costner	Costner Motorsports	Chevrolet	148	0	Running	12
26	28	76	Spencer Boyd	Freedom Racing Enterprises	Chevrolet	148	0	Running	11
27	2	11	Kaden Honeycutt	Tricon Garage	Toyota	147	0	Running	28
28	6	99	Ben Rhodes	ThorSport Racing	Ford	145	0	Running	18
29	34	2	Clayton Green	Team Reaume	Ford	141	0	Running	8
30	8	5	William Sawalich (i)	Tricon Garage	Toyota	120	0	Running	0
31	15	16	Justin Haley	Kaulig Racing	Ram	108	0	Suspension	6
32	11	98	Jake Garcia	ThorSport Racing	Ford	75	0	Accident	7
33	9	15	Tanner Gray	Tricon Garage	Toyota	72	0	Accident	7
34	3	77	Jesse Love (i)	Spire Motorsports	Chevrolet	70	0	Accident	0
35	20	25	Carson Ferguson	Kaulig Racing	Ram	59	0	Accident	2
36	14	42	Tyler Reif	Niece Motorsports	Chevrolet	55	0	Accident	1
Official race results

=== Race statistics ===
- Lead changes: 5 among 3 different drivers
- Cautions/Laps: 8 for 48 laps
- Red flags: 0
- Time of race: 1 hour, 59 minutes and 45 seconds
- Average speed: 99.958 miles per hour (160.867 km/h)

== Standings after the race ==
Drivers' Championship standings

	Pos	Driver	Points
1	1	Layne Riggs	458
1	2	Kaden Honeycutt	421 (–37)
	3	Christian Eckes	365 (–93)
1	4	Chandler Smith	362 (–96)
1	5	Gio Ruggiero	352 (–106)
1	6	Ty Majeski	309 (–149)
1	7	Ben Rhodes	300 (–158)
2	8	Tyler Ankrum	256 (–202)
2	9	Stewart Friesen	254 (–204)
1	10	Daniel Hemric	254 (–204)
Official driver's standings

Manufacturers' Championship standings

	Pos	Manufacturer	Points
	1	Toyota	454
1	2	Ford	446 (–8)
1	3	Chevrolet	434 (–20)
	4	Ram	297 (–157)

- Note: Only the first 10 positions are included for the driver standings.

== Notes ==
Previous race: 2026 North Carolina Education Lottery 200	NASCAR Craftsman Truck Series; 2026 season	Next race: 2026 DQS Solutions & Staffing 250
