= Chris Ferguson (racing driver) =

American racing driver

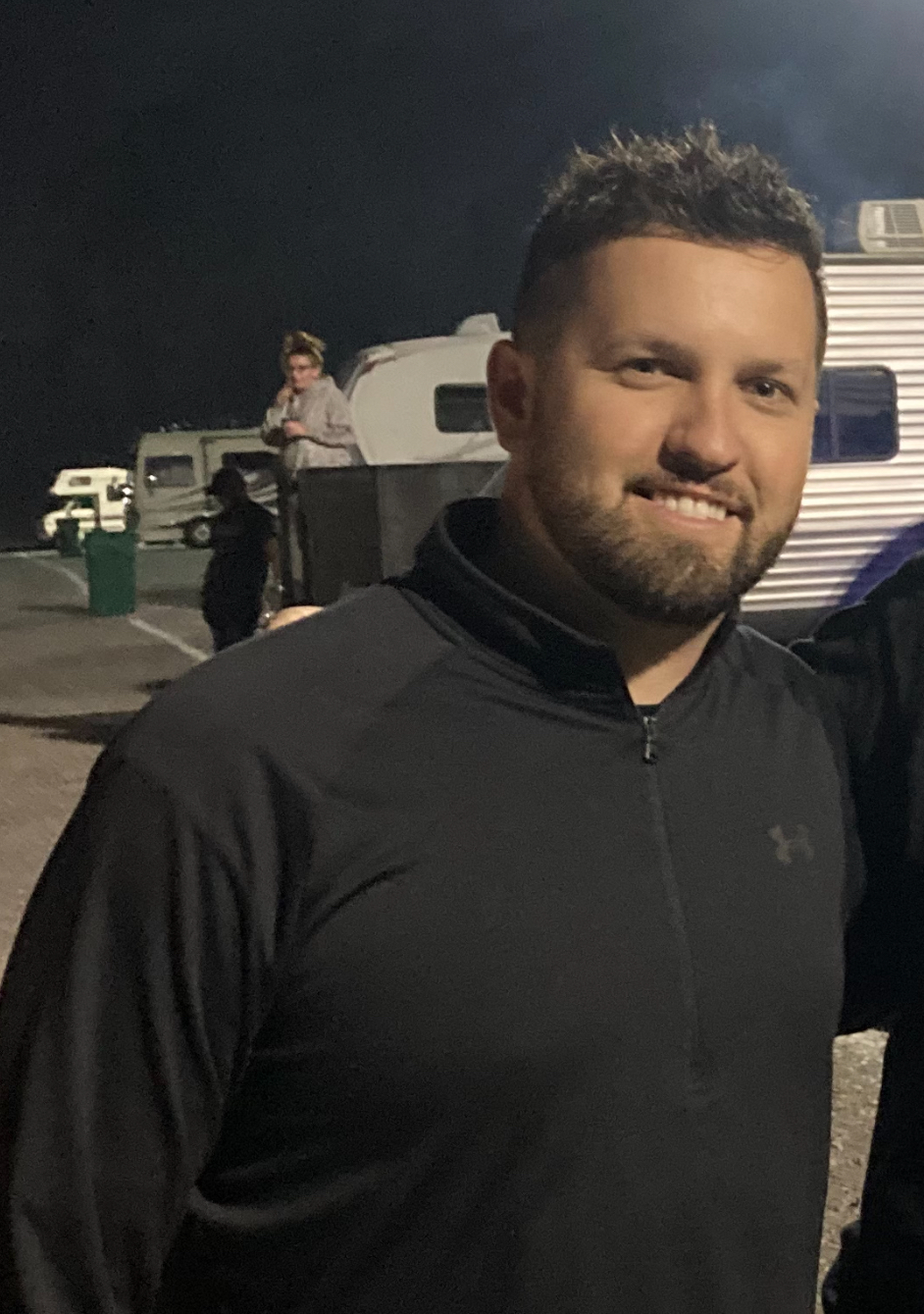
- Ferguson at Bristol Motor Speedway in 2021
- Born: December 30, 1989 (age 36) Mount Holly, North Carolina, U.S.

Lucas Oil Late Model Dirt Series career
- Debut season: 2009
- Current team: Chris Ferguson Motorsports
- Car number: No. 22
- Starts: 96
- Wins: 4
- Poles: 10
- Best finish: 19th in 2020

Championship titles
- 2011 2022 2014 2021, 2022 2012: Ultimate Super Late Model Series Champion; Show-Me 100 Winner; USA 100; Bristol Dirt Nationals Winner; Patriot Nationals Winner

Awards
- 2007 2009: FASTRAK Tour Rookie of the Year; Carolina Clash Super Late Model Series Rookie of the Year
- Statistics up to date as of November 20, 2025.

Chris Ferguson (born December 30, 1989), nicknamed Fergy, is an American professional dirt track racing driver and team owner. He currently competes full-time in Dirt Super Late Model competition, driving the No. 22 Stinger Race Cars for his own team, Chris Ferguson Motorsports.

== Racing career ==
=== Early career ===
Ferguson at Cherokee Speedway in March 2006.

Ferguson, a third-generation racer started racing Go-Karts in 2002 at the age of 12. He would win two state titles, the Daytona Dirt World Championship on his birthday in 2004, as well as two WKA National Championships in Junior Lite and Heavy in 2005.

At the age of 16, Ferguson would move up to Dirt Late Models in the Crate class. In between 2006 and 2009, he would score 20 feature wins, and the 2007 GM Big Ten Shootout championship at Cherokee Speedway.

==== Super Late Models; 2009–present ====
In 2009, Ferguson would move up to Dirt Super Late Models, in the No. 22 for Chris Ferguson Motorsports, which to date he has spent the majority of his career in. He would cap off his rookie season by claiming the Rookie of the Year title for the Carolina Clash Super Late Model Series, as well as picking up two wins on the year.

By 2015, Ferguson had picked up his first career wins with the World of Outlaws, scoring two wins that year at Friendship and Fayetteville respectively. In July 2017, Ferguson would pick up his first victory with the Lucas Oil Late Model Dirt Series at Fayetteville.

Between 2018 and 2025, Ferguson would score several crown jewel wins including Diamond Nationals and the Show-Me 100 in 2022, the Bristol Dirt Nationals in both 2021 and 2022, as well as more victories with the Lucas Oil Late Model Dirt Series.

== Personal life ==
Ferguson is a Christian and married his wife Genna Gentry on November 23, 2024.

Ferguson is the older cousin of Carson Ferguson.

Ferguson graduated from East Gaston High School and would later attend UNC Charlotte, majoring in business, but would ultimately not finish his degree.

== Victory Seats ==
Victory Seats
- Type: Private
- Industry: Automotive
- Founded: September 7, 2024; 2 years ago in Charlotte, North Carolina, U.S.
- Founders: Chris Ferguson
- Headquarters: Charlotte, North Carolina, U.S.
- Products: Racing seats
- Owners: Chris Ferguson
- Website: www.victoryseats.com

Victory Seats, is a seating company based in Charlotte, North Carolina, founded in 2024 by Ferguson. The company currently offers a range of Dirt Late Model, Sprint Car, Dirt Midget, and Asphalt Late Model seats.

Sporting positions
Preceded by Inaugural	Ultimate Super Late Model Series Champion; 2011	Succeeded by Casey Roberts
Achievements
Preceded by Ron Parker	Patriot Nationals Winner; 2012	Succeeded by Ryan Atkins
Preceded by Jamie Lathroum	USA 100 Winner; 2014	Succeeded by Shane Clanton
Preceded by Inaugural	Bristol Dirt Nationals Winner; 2021, 2022	Succeeded by Jonathan Davenport; Chris Madden
Preceded by Hudson O'Neal	Show-Me 100 Winner; 2022	Succeeded by Devin Moran
