= 2026 DQS Solutions & Staffing 250 =

NASCAR Craftsman Truck Series race at Michigan International Speedway

Race details
- Race 12 of 25 in the 2026 NASCAR Craftsman Truck Series
- Date: June 6, 2026
- Location: Michigan International Speedway in Brooklyn, Michigan
- Course: Permanent racing facility
- Course length: 2.0 miles (3.2 km)
- Distance: 125 laps, 250 mi (402.336 km)
- Average speed: 119.984 miles per hour (193.096 km/h)

Pole position
Driver	Ty Majeski	ThorSport Racing
- Time: 39.257

Most laps led
Driver	Carson Hocevar	Spire Motorsports
- Laps: 65

Fastest lap
Driver	Corey Heim	Tricon Garage
- Time: 39.213

Winner
No. 1	Corey Heim	Tricon Garage

Television in the United States
- Network: FS1
- Announcers: Brent Stover, Michael Waltrip, and Todd Bodine

Radio in the United States
- Radio: NRN
- Booth announcers: Alex Hayden and Mike Bagley
- Turn announcers: Dave Moody (1–2) and Tim Catalfamo (3–4)

The 2026 DQS Solutions & Staffing 250 was a NASCAR Craftsman Truck Series race held on Saturday, June 6, 2026, at Michigan International Speedway in Brooklyn, Michigan. Contested over 125 laps on the 2-mile (3.219 km) speedway, it was the twelfth race of the 2026 NASCAR Craftsman Truck Series season, and the second running of the event.

In an action-packed race, Corey Heim, driving for Tricon Garage, made a late pass on Carson Hocevar, leading the final 15 laps and holding off his teammate Kaden Honeycutt to earn his 26th career NASCAR Craftsman Truck Series win, and his third of the season. Christopher Bell swept both stages, and Hocevar led a race-high 65 laps. Honeycutt finished second, and Hocevar finished third. Front Row Motorsports teammates Layne Riggs and Chandler Smith rounded out the top five, while Bell, Ricky Stenhouse Jr., Connor Mosack, Jake Garcia, and Tyler Ankrum rounded out the top ten.

== Report ==
=== Background ===
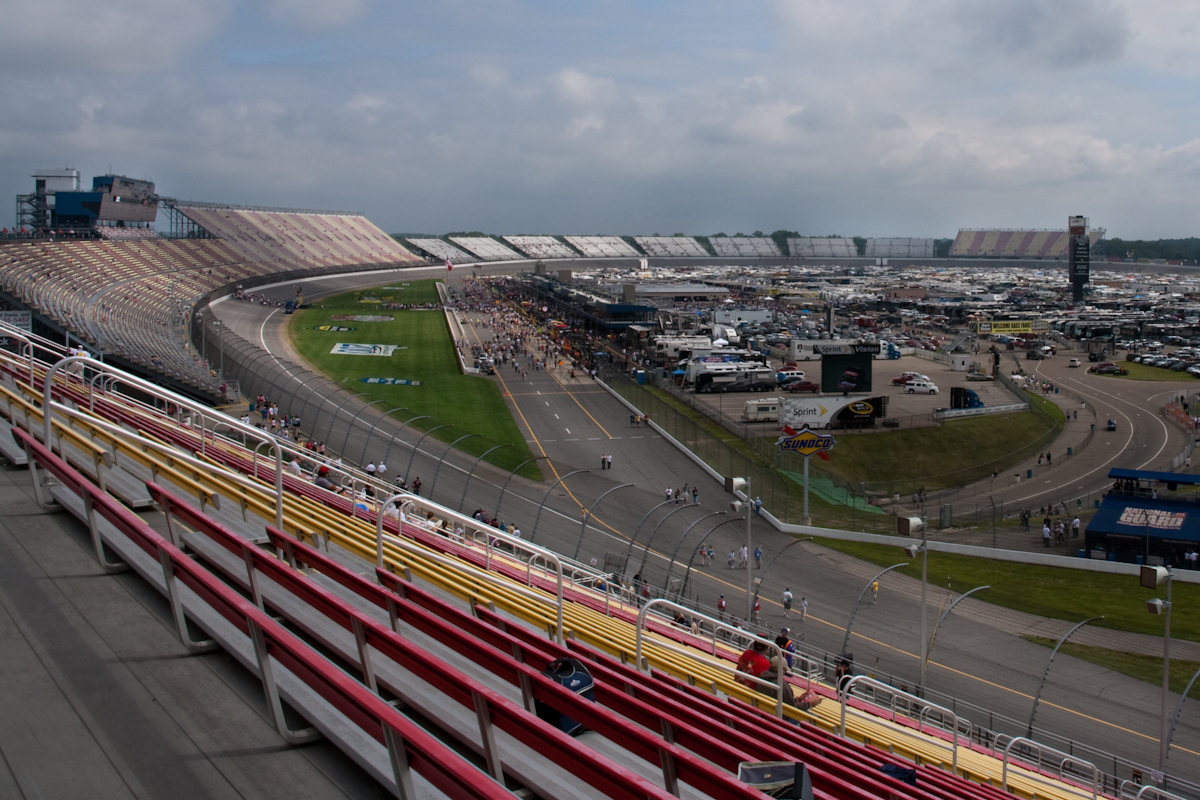
Michigan International Speedway, the track where the race was held.

The race was held at Michigan International Speedway, a two-mile (3.2 km) moderate-banked D-shaped speedway located in Brooklyn, Michigan. The track is used primarily for NASCAR events. It is known as a "sister track" to Texas World Speedway as MIS's oval design was a direct basis of TWS, with moderate modifications to the banking in the corners, and was used as the basis of Auto Club Speedway. The track is owned by International Speedway Corporation. Michigan International Speedway is recognized as one of motorsports' premier facilities because of its wide racing surface and high banking (by open-wheel standards; the 18-degree banking is modest by stock car standards).

==== Entry list ====
- (R) denotes rookie driver.
- (i) denotes driver who is ineligible for series driver points.

#	Driver	Team	Make
1	Corey Heim	Tricon Garage	Toyota
2	Morgen Baird	Team Reaume	Ford
4	Cleetus McFarland (i)	Niece Motorsports	Chevrolet
5	Spencer Davis	Tricon Garage	Toyota
7	Connor Mosack	Spire Motorsports	Chevrolet
9	Grant Enfinger	CR7 Motorsports	Chevrolet
10	Corey LaJoie	Kaulig Racing	Ram
11	Kaden Honeycutt	Tricon Garage	Toyota
12	Brenden Queen (R)	Kaulig Racing	Ram
13	Cole Butcher (R)	ThorSport Racing	Ford
14	Mini Tyrrell (R)	Kaulig Racing	Ram
15	Tanner Gray	Tricon Garage	Toyota
16	Justin Haley	Kaulig Racing	Ram
17	Gio Ruggiero	Tricon Garage	Toyota
18	Tyler Ankrum	McAnally–Hilgemann Racing	Chevrolet
19	Daniel Hemric	McAnally–Hilgemann Racing	Chevrolet
20	Daniel Dye	McAnally–Hilgemann Racing	Chevrolet
22	Josh Reaume	Team Reaume	Ford
25	Parker Kligerman	Kaulig Racing	Ram
26	Dawson Sutton	Rackley W.A.R.	Chevrolet
33	Frankie Muniz	Team Reaume	Ford
34	Layne Riggs	Front Row Motorsports	Ford
38	Chandler Smith	Front Row Motorsports	Ford
42	Ricky Stenhouse Jr. (i)	Niece Motorsports	Chevrolet
44	Andrés Pérez de Lara	Niece Motorsports	Chevrolet
45	Ross Chastain (i)	Niece Motorsports	Chevrolet
52	Stewart Friesen	Halmar Friesen Racing	Toyota
62	Christopher Bell (i)	Halmar Friesen Racing	Toyota
76	Spencer Boyd	Freedom Racing Enterprises	Chevrolet
77	Carson Hocevar (i)	Spire Motorsports	Chevrolet
81	Kris Wright	McAnally–Hilgemann Racing	Chevrolet
88	Ty Majeski	ThorSport Racing	Ford
91	Christian Eckes	McAnally–Hilgemann Racing	Chevrolet
93	Caleb Costner	Costner Motorsports	Chevrolet
98	Jake Garcia	ThorSport Racing	Ford
99	Ben Rhodes	ThorSport Racing	Ford
Official entry list

== Practice ==
The first and only practice session was held on Saturday, June 6, at 9:30 AM EST, and lasted for 50 minutes.

Gio Ruggiero, driving for Tricon Garage, set the fastest time in the session, with a lap of 38.805 seconds, and a speed of 185.543 miles per hour (298.603 km/h).

Pos.	#	Driver	Team	Make	Time	Speed
1	17	Gio Ruggiero	Tricon Garage	Toyota	38.805	185.543
2	1	Corey Heim	Tricon Garage	Toyota	38.835	185.400
3	13	Cole Butcher (R)	ThorSport Racing	Ford	38.839	185.381
Full practice results

== Qualifying ==
Qualifying was held on Saturday, June 6, at 10:35 AM EST. Since Michigan International Speedway is a superspeedway with intermediate rules, the qualifying procedure used was a single-car, one-lap system with one round. Drivers were on track by themselves and had one lap to post a qualifying time, and whoever set the fastest time won the pole.

Road course qualifying rules were in effect. The timing line was set in Turn 3, where cars exited pit road, and drove five-eighths of a lap, then took the green flag in the north chute exiting Turn 3 and completed their lap there the next time by. Teams then immediately pitted the car, meaning only two laps were run. Indianapolis and Michigan both use restrictor plates.

Ty Majeski, driving for ThorSport Racing, qualified on pole position with a lap of 39.257 seconds, and a speed of 183.407 miles per hour (295.165 km/h).

No drivers failed to qualify.

=== Qualifying results ===
Pos.	#	Driver	Team	Make	Time	Speed
1	88	Ty Majeski	ThorSport Racing	Ford	39.257	183.407
2	62	Christopher Bell (i)	Halmar Friesen Racing	Toyota	39.332	183.057
3	38	Chandler Smith	Front Row Motorsports	Ford	39.350	182.973
4	34	Layne Riggs	Front Row Motorsports	Ford	39.365	182.904
5	7	Connor Mosack	Spire Motorsports	Chevrolet	39.383	182.820
6	77	Carson Hocevar (i)	Spire Motorsports	Chevrolet	39.432	182.593
7	13	Cole Butcher (R)	ThorSport Racing	Ford	39.434	182.584
8	17	Gio Ruggiero	Tricon Garage	Toyota	39.456	182.482
9	98	Jake Garcia	ThorSport Racing	Ford	39.508	182.242
10	5	Spencer Davis	Tricon Garage	Toyota	39.523	182.172
11	9	Grant Enfinger	CR7 Motorsports	Chevrolet	39.527	182.154
12	52	Stewart Friesen	Halmar Friesen Racing	Toyota	39.541	182.089
13	18	Tyler Ankrum	McAnally–Hilgemann Racing	Chevrolet	39.555	182.025
14	10	Corey LaJoie	Kaulig Racing	Ram	39.556	182.020
15	45	Ross Chastain (i)	Niece Motorsports	Chevrolet	39.560	182.002
16	26	Dawson Sutton	Rackley W.A.R.	Chevrolet	39.577	181.924
17	11	Kaden Honeycutt	Tricon Garage	Toyota	39.584	181.892
18	44	Andrés Pérez de Lara	Niece Motorsports	Chevrolet	39.595	181.841
19	42	Ricky Stenhouse Jr. (i)	Niece Motorsports	Chevrolet	39.602	181.809
20	91	Christian Eckes	McAnally–Hilgemann Racing	Chevrolet	39.625	181.703
21	12	Brenden Queen (R)	Kaulig Racing	Ram	39.662	181.534
22	16	Justin Haley	Kaulig Racing	Ram	39.683	181.438
23	1	Corey Heim	Tricon Garage	Toyota	39.691	181.401
24	19	Daniel Hemric	McAnally–Hilgemann Racing	Chevrolet	39.830	180.768
25	25	Parker Kligerman	Kaulig Racing	Ram	39.839	180.727
26	20	Daniel Dye	McAnally–Hilgemann Racing	Chevrolet	39.869	180.591
27	81	Kris Wright	McAnally–Hilgemann Racing	Chevrolet	39.949	180.230
28	76	Spencer Boyd	Freedom Racing Enterprises	Chevrolet	39.956	180.198
29	4	Cleetus McFarland (i)	Niece Motorsports	Chevrolet	39.963	180.167
30	14	Mini Tyrrell (R)	Kaulig Racing	Ram	40.005	179.978
31	33	Frankie Muniz	Team Reaume	Ford	40.101	179.547
Qualified by owner's points
32	22	Josh Reaume	Team Reaume	Ford	40.198	179.113
33	2	Morgen Baird	Team Reaume	Ford	40.649	177.126
34	93	Caleb Costner	Costner Motorsports	Chevrolet	41.380	173.997
35	99	Ben Rhodes	ThorSport Racing	Ford	44.607	161.410
36	15	Tanner Gray	Tricon Garage	Toyota	—	—
Official qualifying results
Official starting lineup

== Race results ==
Stage 1 Laps: 30

Pos.	#	Driver	Team	Make	Pts
1	62	Christopher Bell (i)	Halmar Friesen Racing	Toyota	0
2	77	Carson Hocevar (i)	Spire Motorsports	Chevrolet	0
3	11	Kaden Honeycutt	Tricon Garage	Toyota	8
4	38	Chandler Smith	Front Row Motorsports	Ford	7
5	34	Layne Riggs	Front Row Motorsports	Ford	6
6	1	Corey Heim	Tricon Garage	Toyota	5
7	91	Christian Eckes	McAnally–Hilgemann Racing	Chevrolet	4
8	17	Gio Ruggiero	Tricon Garage	Toyota	3
9	98	Jake Garcia	ThorSport Racing	Ford	2
10	45	Ross Chastain (i)	Niece Motorsports	Chevrolet	0

Stage 2 Laps: 30

Pos.	#	Driver	Team	Make	Pts
1	62	Christopher Bell (i)	Halmar Friesen Racing	Toyota	0
2	1	Corey Heim	Tricon Garage	Toyota	9
3	77	Carson Hocevar (i)	Spire Motorsports	Chevrolet	0
4	11	Kaden Honeycutt	Tricon Garage	Toyota	7
5	38	Chandler Smith	Front Row Motorsports	Ford	6
6	91	Christian Eckes	McAnally–Hilgemann Racing	Chevrolet	5
7	45	Ross Chastain (i)	Niece Motorsports	Chevrolet	0
8	17	Gio Ruggiero	Tricon Garage	Toyota	3
9	9	Grant Enfinger	CR7 Motorsports	Chevrolet	2
10	88	Ty Majeski	ThorSport Racing	Ford	1

Stage 3 Laps: 65

Fin	St	#	Driver	Team	Make	Laps	Led	Status	Pts
1	23	1	Corey Heim	Tricon Garage	Toyota	125	15	Running	70
2	17	11	Kaden Honeycutt	Tricon Garage	Toyota	125	1	Running	50
3	6	77	Carson Hocevar (i)	Spire Motorsports	Chevrolet	125	65	Running	0
4	4	34	Layne Riggs	Front Row Motorsports	Ford	125	0	Running	39
5	3	38	Chandler Smith	Front Row Motorsports	Ford	125	0	Running	45
6	2	62	Christopher Bell (i)	Halmar Friesen Racing	Toyota	125	37	Running	0
7	19	42	Ricky Stenhouse Jr. (i)	Niece Motorsports	Chevrolet	125	0	Running	0
8	5	7	Connor Mosack	Spire Motorsports	Chevrolet	125	0	Running	29
9	9	98	Jake Garcia	ThorSport Racing	Ford	125	0	Running	30
10	13	18	Tyler Ankrum	McAnally–Hilgemann Racing	Chevrolet	125	0	Running	27
11	11	9	Grant Enfinger	CR7 Motorsports	Chevrolet	125	0	Running	28
12	8	17	Gio Ruggiero	Tricon Garage	Toyota	125	0	Running	31
13	24	19	Daniel Hemric	McAnally–Hilgemann Racing	Chevrolet	125	0	Running	24
14	21	12	Brenden Queen (R)	Kaulig Racing	Ram	125	0	Running	23
15	26	20	Daniel Dye	McAnally–Hilgemann Racing	Chevrolet	125	3	Running	22
16	25	25	Parker Kligerman	Kaulig Racing	Ram	125	0	Running	21
17	15	45	Ross Chastain (i)	Niece Motorsports	Chevrolet	125	0	Running	0
18	36	15	Tanner Gray	Tricon Garage	Toyota	125	0	Running	19
19	18	44	Andrés Pérez de Lara	Niece Motorsports	Chevrolet	125	0	Running	18
20	30	14	Mini Tyrrell (R)	Kaulig Racing	Ram	125	0	Running	17
21	35	99	Ben Rhodes	ThorSport Racing	Ford	125	0	Running	16
22	12	52	Stewart Friesen	Halmar Friesen Racing	Toyota	125	0	Running	15
23	31	33	Frankie Muniz	Team Reaume	Ford	125	0	Running	14
24	10	5	Spencer Davis	Tricon Garage	Toyota	125	0	Running	13
25	29	4	Cleetus McFarland (i)	Niece Motorsports	Chevrolet	125	0	Running	0
26	33	2	Morgen Baird	Team Reaume	Ford	124	0	Running	11
27	34	93	Caleb Costner	Costner Motorsports	Chevrolet	123	0	Running	10
28	22	16	Justin Haley	Kaulig Racing	Ram	123	0	Running	9
29	14	10	Corey LaJoie	Kaulig Racing	Ram	123	0	Running	8
30	32	22	Josh Reaume	Team Reaume	Ford	122	0	Running	7
31	27	81	Kris Wright	McAnally–Hilgemann Racing	Chevrolet	121	0	Running	6
32	20	91	Christian Eckes	McAnally–Hilgemann Racing	Chevrolet	119	0	Running	14
33	7	13	Cole Butcher (R)	ThorSport Racing	Ford	93	0	Accident	4
34	28	76	Spencer Boyd	Freedom Racing Enterprises	Chevrolet	92	0	Accident	3
35	1	88	Ty Majeski	ThorSport Racing	Ford	87	4	Accident	3
36	16	26	Dawson Sutton	Rackley W.A.R.	Chevrolet	54	0	Accident	1
Official race results

=== Race statistics ===
- Lead changes: 20 among 6 different drivers
- Cautions/Laps: 7 for 34 laps
- Red flags: 0
- Time of race: 2 hours, 5 minutes and 1 second
- Average speed: 119.984 miles per hour (193.096 km/h)

== Standings after the race ==
Drivers' Championship standings

	Pos	Driver	Points
	1	Layne Riggs	497
	2	Kaden Honeycutt	471 (–26)
1	3	Chandler Smith	407 (–90)
1	4	Gio Ruggiero	383 (–114)
2	5	Christian Eckes	379 (–118)
1	6	Ben Rhodes	316 (–181)
1	7	Ty Majeski	312 (–185)
	8	Tyler Ankrum	283 (–214)
1	9	Daniel Hemric	278 (–219)
1	10	Jake Garcia	278 (–219)
Official driver's standings

Manufacturers' Championship standings

	Pos	Manufacturer	Points
	1	Toyota	454
1	2	Ford	446 (–8)
1	3	Chevrolet	434 (–20)
	4	Ram	297 (–157)

- Note: Only the first 10 positions are included for the driver standings.

Previous race: 2026 Allegiance 200	NASCAR Craftsman Truck Series; 2026 season	Next race: 2026 Navy 250
