= Kyle Loftis =

American automotive media personality (1982–2026)

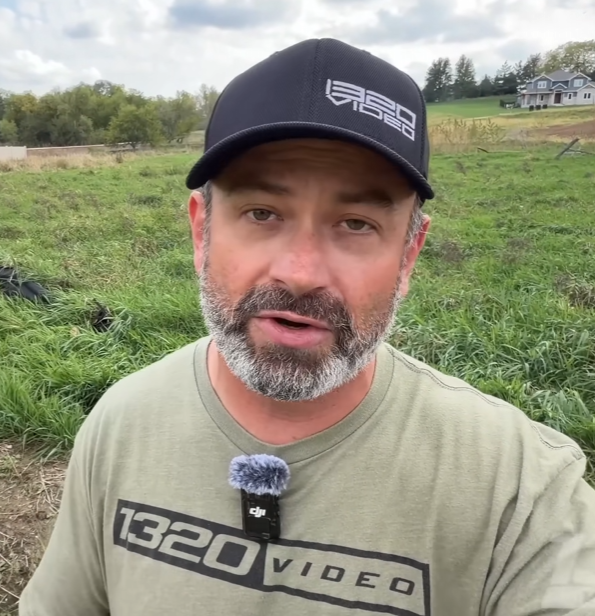
- Loftis in 2025
- Born: Kyle A. Loftis; September 21, 1982; Lincoln, Nebraska, U.S.
- Died: May 5, 2026 (aged 43); Omaha, Nebraska, U.S.
- Education: University of Nebraska Omaha
- Occupations: Media producer, businessman
- Known for: Founder of 1320Video

Kyle A. Loftis (September 21, 1982 – May 5, 2026) was an American media producer and automotive racer. He was the founder of 1320Video, one of the most-followed automotive media companies in the world. He was known for covering street racing, drag racing, and car culture. Loftis was considered a pioneer in modern street car and drag racing media, and was a key figure in the success of several major automotive influencers such as Cleetus McFarland.

== Career ==
Loftis founded 1320Video in 2003 while still in college, before social media was a huge part of automotive media. The company began with Loftis taking photos and recording videos of cars street racing and drag racing, then sharing them on online forums and selling them on DVDs. The name, 1320Video was derived from a reference to a quarter mile drag strip, which is 1320 feet long.

He worked at PayPal for nearly ten years after graduating college, but left in 2015 to work on 1320Video full-time.

1320Video later became one of the most recognizable brands in street car and drag racing coverage, covering events such as Hot Rod Drag Week, TX2K, FL2K, Cash Days, Street Car Takeover, and other automotive and drag racing events. By 2026, the brand had nearly 4 million YouTube subscribers, more than 6 million Facebook followers, and nearly 3 million Instagram followers.

Loftis hired Garrett Mitchell to work as a social media manager for 1320Video part-time in 2009. In 2015, a comedic video went viral, in which Loftis referred to Mitchell as Cleetus McFarland. That video, along with his work with 1320Video, led to Mitchell's rise as one of the most ubiquitous automotive and drag racing influencers. Mitchell gifted Loftis a brand-new 2026 Corvette ZR1 just weeks before Loftis' death.

He also organized the Ice Cream Cruise charity rally. The event raised more than $750,000 for nonprofit organizations in the Omaha area.

1320Video brought wider popularity to street car culture and drag racing, and Loftis was credited as one of the most influential people in the rise of motorsports on social media.

Loftis was involved in a severe accident while in a Toyota Supra in California early 2026.

== Death ==
Loftis died on May 5, 2026, at the age of 43. His death was announced on 1320Video's social media accounts the following day. The Sarpy County Sheriff's Office said his death was "not suspicious", and no cause of his death was released "out of respect for privacy". Hundreds of thousands of users on social media reacted to his death, sharing tributes of his impact, and over 100 vehicles participated in a memorial cruise held in his birth town of Lincoln, Nebraska.
