= Freedom Factory =

Racing venue in Bradenton, Florida

Fastest 3/8 Mile Speedway in the South
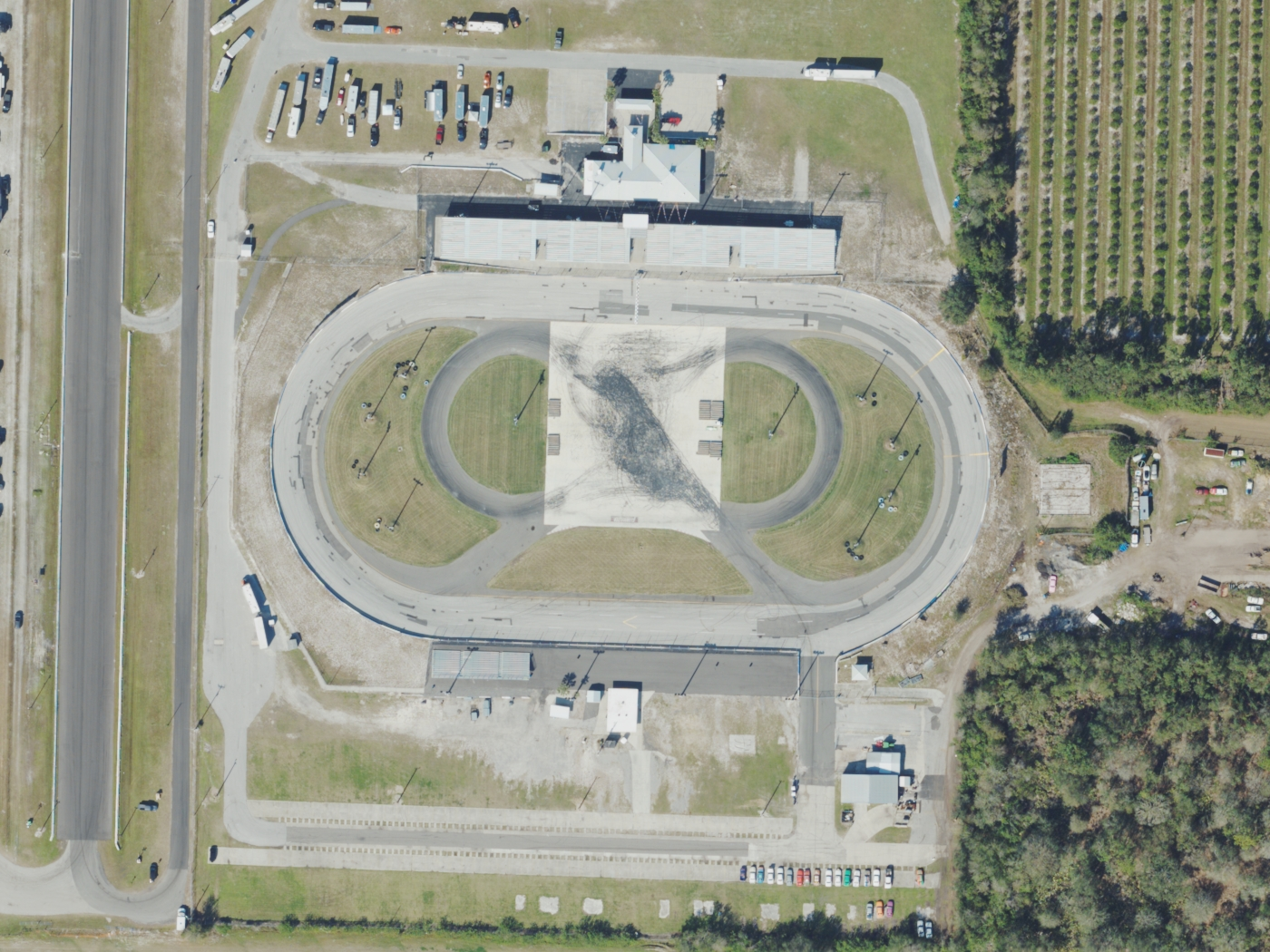
- 2023 aerial view of the track. Bradenton Motorsports Park is adjacent to the track.
- Location: 21050 East State Road 64; Bradenton, Florida, USA
- Coordinates: 27°27′56″N 82°19′30″W
- Owner: Cleetus McFarland
- Broke ground: Late 1970s
- Opened: 1978
- Former names: Desoto Speedway (1978–2020)
- Major events: Current: Freedom 500 (2020–present); Altima 600 (2024–present); 2.4 Hours of LeMullets (2020–present); Florida Man Games (2026–present); Bill Bigley, Sr. Memorial 128 (2023–present); Bigley Memorial Tune-Up 125 (2025–present); Tour of Destruction (2020–present); Future: CARS Tour (2027)
- Website: freedomfactoryusa.com

Paved-Oval (1978–present)
- Surface: Asphalt
- Length: 0.37 mi (0.60 km)
- Turns: 4
- Banking: Turns: 12° Straightaways: 6°

The Freedom Factory, (formerly Desoto Speedway from 1971 to 2020) is a 3/8 mi (0.60 km) oval short track in Bradenton, Florida. The track primarily holds events held by YouTuber and owner Cleetus McFarland.

== History ==
=== Early years ===
The track was opened around the late-1970s under the name Desoto Speedway. The track remained open until 2018, where it then sat abandoned.

=== Under McFarland ===
In January 2020, content creator Cleetus McFarland bought the abandoned Desoto Speedway, a 3/8 mi (0.60 km) asphalt oval and figure 8 track in Manatee County, Florida, and later renamed the track to the Freedom Factory.

McFarland stated in an interview on a podcast that the idea for the Ford Crown Victorias racing events originated during the early 2020 COVID‑19 lockdowns, when the newly purchased Freedom Factory could not host spectators and he needed an alternative source of revenue. He explained that the financial strain from acquiring the facility, combined with a bounced IRS quarterly tax prepayment, led him to create pay‑per‑view races featuring decommissioned Ford Crown Victorias with nitrous driven by internet personalities. As the format grew in popularity over the following years, professional drivers, including current NASCAR competitors and Hall of Famers, began participating in the events, especially the Freedom 500.

On September 28, 2026, it was announced that the CARS Tour would have their 2027 season opener at the Freedom Factory, with McFarland, Dale Earnhardt Jr. and Kevin Harvick headlining the event.

== Incidents ==
In 2017, Dave Steele was killed in a racing accident during a Southern Sprintcar Shootout Series race at the track on March 25, 2017. His car's front wheel struck and overrode the rear wheel of another car during the event, sending him into the wall; he was pronounced dead at the scene.

During one of McFarland's "Cleetus and Cars" events in November 2020, Parker Whitlock suffered third-degree burns due to a radiator hose explosion. Until this event, drivers that entered the competition were not required to be wearing a full fire suit. During Whitlock's burnout in his bodyless Ford Mustang, a radiator hose routed past the driver exploded. Because Whitlock was only wearing a hoodie and shorts, he suffered third-degree burns and required multiple skin grafts.

== Bradenton Motorsports Park ==
Bradenton Motorsports Park
- Location: 21000 East State Road 64Bradenton, Florida, USA
- Capacity: 3,000
- Owner: Victor Alvarez; Cleetus McFarland (50%, since 2025)
- Broke ground: 1972
- Opened: 1972
- Former names: DeSoto Memorial Dragway (1972–2000)
- Major events: Current: FL2K (2012–2021, 2023–present); Snowbird Outlaw Nationals (1972–present); U.S. Street Nationals (2005–present); Summernats USA (2026–present); Out For Blood (2020–present); Christmas Tree Drags (2020–present)
- Website: freedomfactoryusa.com

Dragstrip (1974–present)
- Surface: Concrete (quarter mile); Asphalt (shutdown area)
- Length: 0.40 km (0.25 mi)

Bradenton Motorsports Park is an NHRA-sanctioned drag strip located adjacent to the Freedom Factory. Founded in 1972, BMP hosts events such as the FL2K, the Snowbird Outlaw Nationals and U.S. Street Nationals.

=== History ===
BMP opened in the early 1970s, originally operating under the name DeSoto Memorial Dragway.

In 2013, the track hosted their first FL2K, a drag racing event similar to the TX2K. The event developed around drag racing competition and streetcar culture, later expanding into a multi-day motorsports festival, still centered around roll racing and drag racing. In 2022, FL2K was temporarily held at Gainesville Raceway following damage caused by Hurricane Ian. The event returned to Bradenton Motorsports Park in 2023.

In 2024, track organizer Victor Alvarez announced major infrastructure upgrades at BMP, including track improvements, expanded entrances, and other major facility renovations.

=== Partnership with Cleetus McFarland ===
In January 2025, Internet personality Cleetus McFarland announced he had acquired a 50% ownership stake in BMP, the adjacent quarter-mile drag strip, partnering with existing owner Victor Alvarez.

McFarland said the deal followed record attendance at a BMP event in October 2024 that left the facility "bursting at the seams with growth."
