= FL2K =

Annual drag racing event in Bradenton, Florida

- Frequency: Annual
- Venue: Bradenton Motorsports Park (2013–2021, 2023–present); Gainesville Raceway (2022)
- Locations: Bradenton, Florida, United States
- Inaugurated: 2013
- Attendance: 20,000+
- Sponsor: FuelTech, Garrett Motion, Haltech, Motion Raceworks, Brian Crower Inc.
- Website: https://fl2k.com/

FL2K is an annual drag racing and roll racing event held in Florida. The event is centered on high-horsepower street cars and other drag racing vehicles, and is widely considered as one of the largest drag and roll racing events in the United States.

The event includes drag racing, roll racing, car shows, exhibitions from sponsors and vendors, and exhibitions of high-horsepower street cars and other race vehicles.

Similar to how TX2K names is structured, each iteration of the event is named by year, such as FL2K23 and FL2K24.

== History ==
FL2K was established in 2013 at Bradenton Motorsports Park in Bradenton, Florida. The event developed around drag racing competition and streetcar culture, later expanding into a multi-day motorsports festival, still centered around roll racing and drag racing.

FL2K attracts high-horsepower import cars, domestic cars, and online automotive personalities such as Cleetus McFarland, who is a partial owner of Bradenton Motorsports Park and owner of the adjacent oval track Freedom Factory. Competitors regularly use the event for record attempts and new vehicle debuts.

In 2022, FL2K was temporarily held at Gainesville Raceway following damage caused by Hurricane Ian. The event returned to Bradenton Motorsports Park in 2023.

For the event's 10th anniversary in 2024, organizer Victor Alvarez announced major infrastructure upgrades at Bradenton Motorsports Park, including track improvements, expanded entrances, and other major facility renovations.

== Competition ==
FL2K is primarily known for heads-up drag racing between street-legal vehicles in "shootout" style competition. The event regularly features Toyota Supras, Nissan GT-Rs, and other popular drag car builds alongside domestic muscle cars and even modern supercars.

The event includes classes for small-tire, radial-tire, stick-shift, and front-wheel-drive vehicles.
