= Toyota Supra in motorsport =

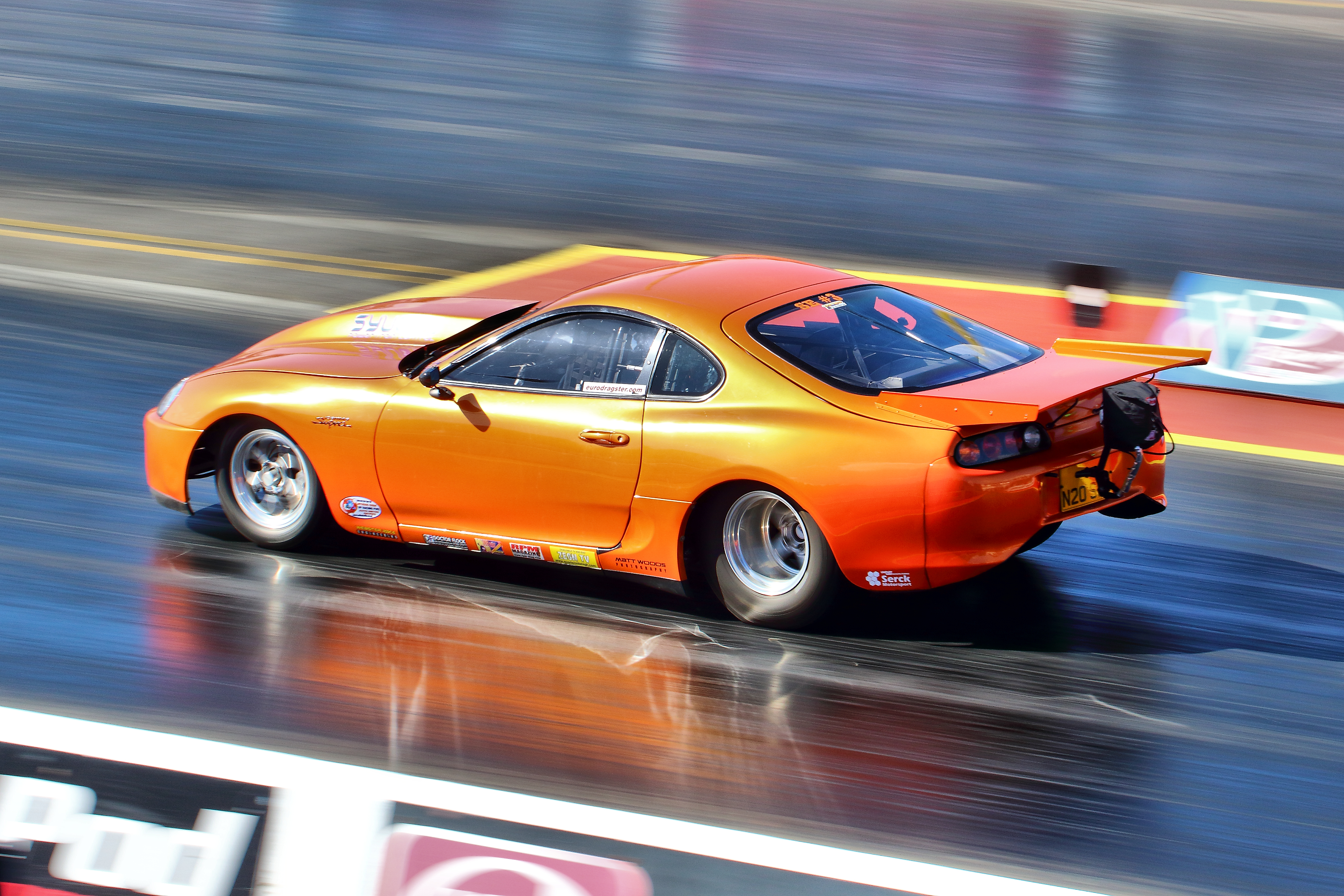
MKIV Supra drag racing at Santa Pod Raceway

During its history the Toyota Supra has enjoyed considerable success in a variety of different motorsports.

== Drag racing ==
The Supra has a history of professional drag racing, mainly in Japan and the United States. The HKS team have used both the Mk III and Mk IV to showcase its products, known as the HKS Drag Supra. This Supra was driven by Charlie Goncalves Catanho. It was mainly built on a custom chassis with a carbon fiber body, the Mk III version housed a de-stroked 2.89-liter twin-turbo 7M-GTE, good for 600 kW (800 bhp) at over 9000 rpm, giving a best quarter mile time of 8.09 seconds. The HKS Drag 70 Supra later set a 7-second 1/4 mile (402 m) in 1991.

One of the first Pro Mod drivers in import drag racing, Vinny Ten used a Supra to hold national records for drag racing in the United States between 1997 and 2000 as well as being the first in the US to build a 700 kW (1,000 bhp) Japanese engine without the need of nitrous or alcohol fuel. Ten also achieved the first for the Supra to break into the 12 to 8 second barriers as well as achieving a speed of over 120 to 260 km/h (160 mph). Ten has since taken his Supra into the six second barrier.

Craig Paisley, another pioneer of sport compact drag racing, also used a nitrous-assisted Supra, his first sport compact, to compete in the same category. He achieved a best of 8.2-second e.t.s at more than 260 km/h (160 mph) and would switch to the factory supported Tacoma by 2002. Paisley was also the first sport compact racer to receive factory sponsorship and support. Toyota became the first Japanese car company to get involved with drag racing.

After years of competing in other cars, in 2002, HKS returned with the Mk IV version of the HKS Drag Supra, driven by Tetsuya "Dryhopp" Kawasaki, its 4.0 liter 1UZ-FE V-8, equipped with two prototype HKS GT3540 turbos, HKS rods and billet crank and stock valves, producing in total of 1,103 kW (1,479 bhp). The HKS Drag 80 Supra set a sub-7 second 1/4 mile in 2001.

In 2003, the Supra was to compete in the NHRA Sport Compact Series, but the car became ineligible when the category it was to enter in, Pro V8, was axed at the beginning of the year, therefore it was permitted to perform demonstration runs throughout the season, where at a round at Old Bridge Township Raceway Park, Englishtown, the Supra took the car's record time of 6.893 ET at 310.81 km/h (193.13 mph), eclipsing its best in Japan of 7.277 posted at Sendai Hi-Land Raceway.

In 2002, in the NHRA's street tire class, the unibodied Titan Motorsport Supra of Mark Mazurowski broke the all-season dominance of Ari Yallon's Rotary Performance RX-7 to take the title and became the fastest uni-body Supra in the world, with a time of 9.42 second and 253.57 km/h (157.56 mph) at Maple Grove Raceway, Pennsylvania, despite a quicker time at Houston Raceway Park of 9.002 at 258.14 km/h (160.40 mph) which was unofficial.

The Supra won all but the first round, losing a final to Yallon. With the cancellation of the Street Tire Class, Titan moved to the Pro RWD class with a 2JZ-GTE-powered Celica The Supra was used by BF Goodrich to advertise its Drag Radials tires which it was equipped with.

Many cars that appeared in the series also appeared in the NDRA (NOPI Drag Racing Association) BF Goodrich Tires Pro Street Tire Series.

In the United Kingdom, Steve Whittaker used a 671 kW (900 bhp) Mk III built around a pro-style chassis to achieve a best of 8.207 at 273.41 km/h (169.89 mph).

Sriyantha Weerasuria and Boost Logic were able to achieve a 396 km/h (246 mph) pass at the Texas Mile and a 7.91 seconds at 305.6 km/h (189.9 mph) quarter mile pass with the stock Getrag V160 transmission. Weerasuria also held the record for the fasted quarter mile in a manual transmission vehicle (which was done in a Supra) which held for many years.

The current record for the fastest pass with the stock Getrag V160 transmission is held by Vlad Yevtushenko at 7.88 at 295 km/h (183 mph).

At TX2K10 (a national racing event that takes place annually in Texas), Boost Logic made a quarter-mile pass with their drag car with a time of 7.59 seconds at 304 km/h (189 mph). The car was driven by Kean Wang.

The record is now held by Ebrahim Kanoo of Bahrain with driver, Gary White. His 10.5 Supra (10.5-inch-wide tire) ran 6.23 seconds at 365 km/h (227 mph) in the quarter mile. He also held the Supra IRS (independent rear suspension) record with his IRS Supra that ran 7.18 seconds at 322 km/h (200 mph) in the quarter mile. Both cars were built and tuned by Titan Motorsports.

The record for fastest Supra IRS (independent rear suspension) was set during TX2K20 at 6.807 at 319 km/h (198 mph), held by Jack Cuoto.

In November 2021, Toyota unveiled the GR Supra body for the NHRA's Funny Car category which it competed in 2022 season.

The record for fastest fifth-generation GR Supra is 7.908 seconds at 283 km/h (176 mph) in the quarter mile, set by Mikey Botti in May 2023 at Darlington Dragway. The modified B58 engine is tuned to approximately 969 kW (1,300 bhp).

== Touring car ==
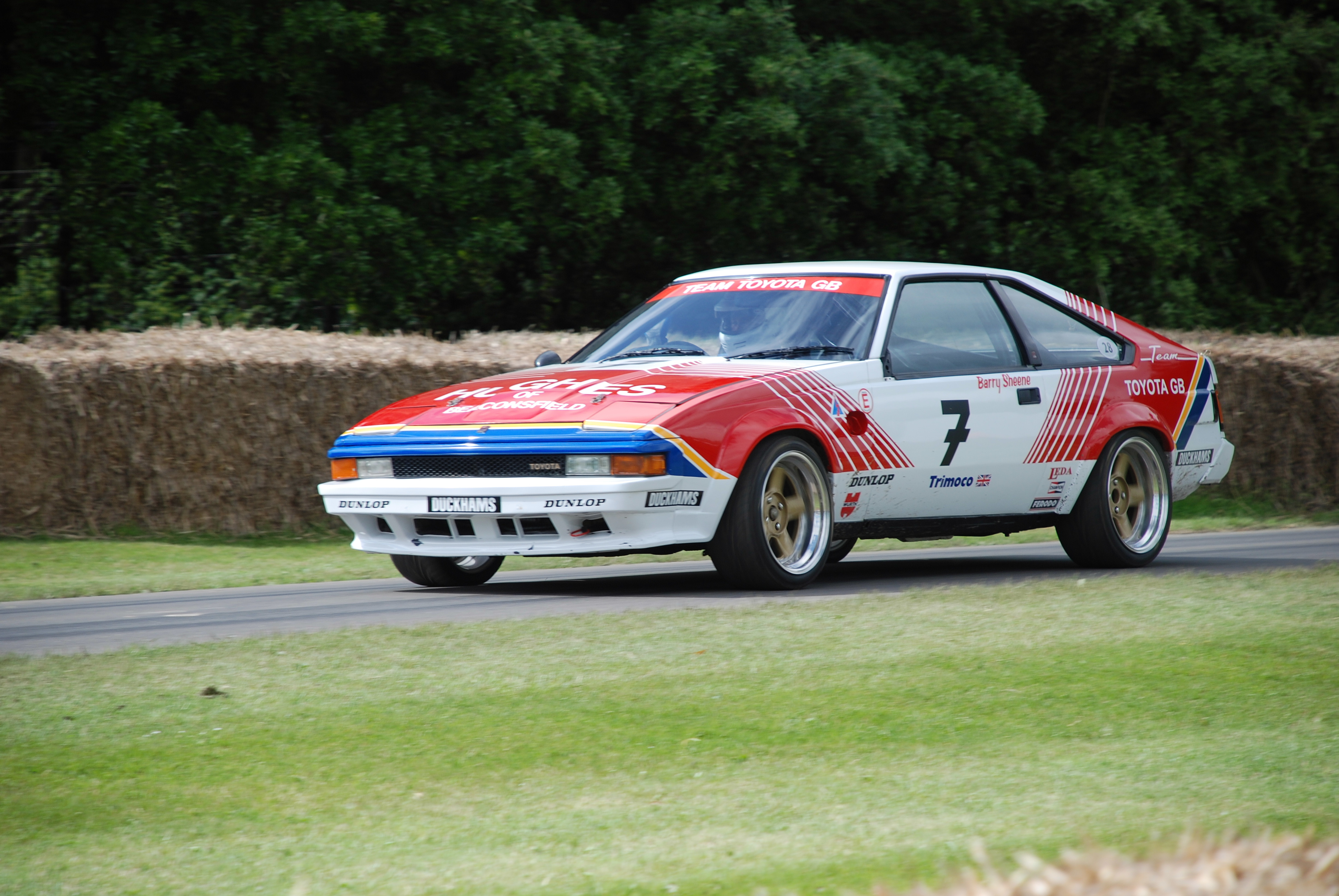
Toyota Supra Mk II used in the 1985 British Saloon Car Championship by Team Toyota GB

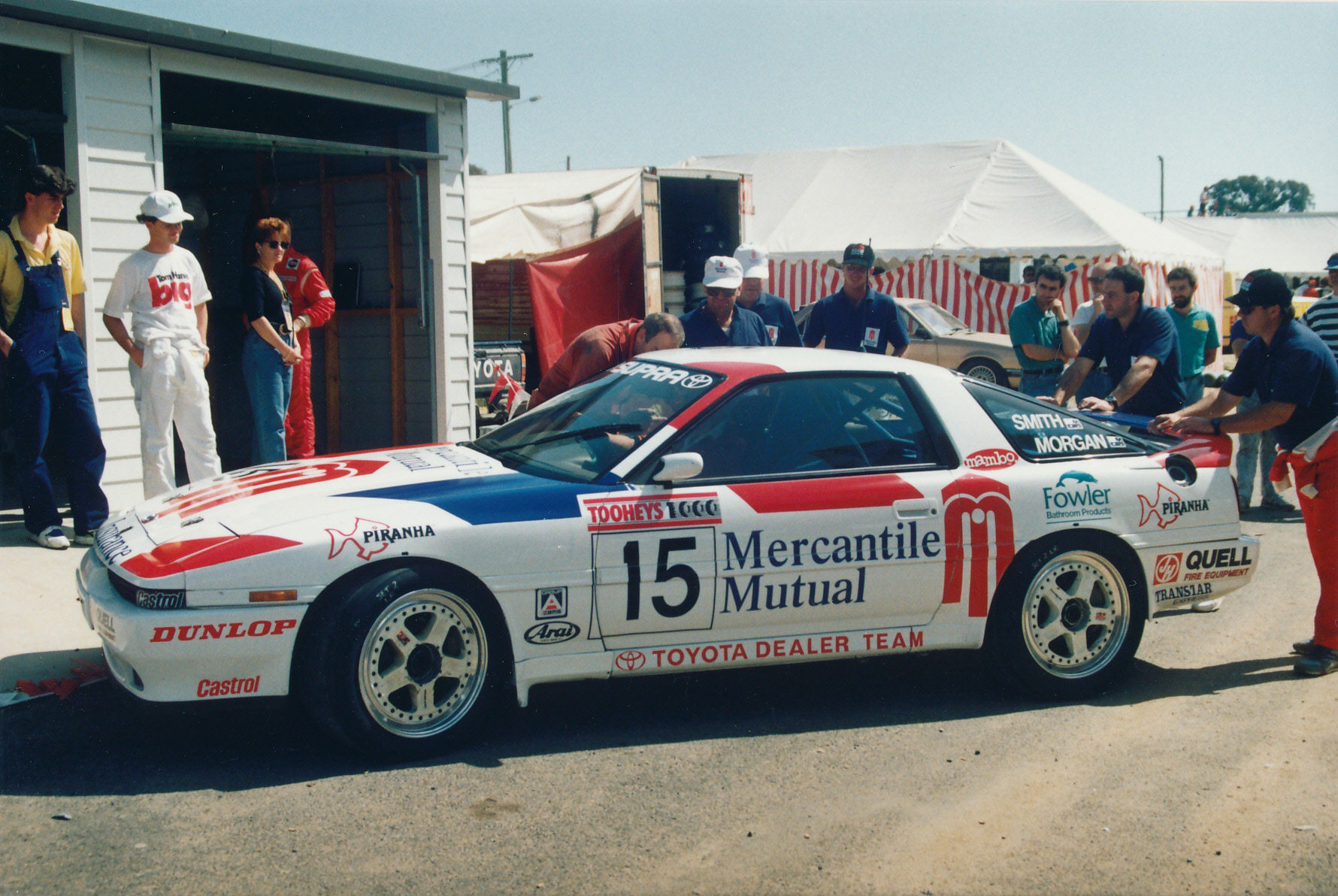
Group A Toyota Supra Mk III used in the Australian Touring Car Championship

During the Group A period, Toyota used the Mk II for Division 3 category touring car racing, especially in the JTCC (Japan), ETCC (Europe), BTCC Britain) and ATCC (Australia) with the AE86 competing in Division 1.

The Mk II Celica Supras debuted in August 1981, although relatively underpowered to be a serious contender against the Rover SD1 and BMW 635CSI, managed to be competitive despite this, being driven by drivers such as Win Percy winning a BTCC round, at Brands Hatch When its star driver, Percy, was tempted away by rival Tom Walkinshaw and his TWR-prepared Jaguar XJS V12, Toyota GB took on Grand Prix motorcycle racing star Barry Sheene, following his retirement from motorcycle racing, for the 1985 BTCC season, but the car was outclassed by the newer turbocharged cars and Sheene's performance was hampered by past motorcycle racing injuries. Nevertheless, he drew in the crowds and retired from professional racing at the end of the season. Later the Toyota Team GB Supra was shipped to a privateer in Australia where it won the first Group A race on the continent.

The Mk II was replaced by the Mk III Supra (MA70) which, like the Mk II, had varying degrees of success, but both TOM'S and SARD, who represented the factory effort competed in 1987-1990, fared better in Japan with the TOM'S team winning its debut, at the Sugo Track, on September 9, 1987. In all, eleven MA70 Group-A turbos were built by TRD Japan for racing. In 1987 the Turbo MK III was fairly competitive in Japan - it not only won its debut race, but also for the remainder of the race season the Supras outqualified all Nissan Skylines (HR31 and DR30) in Division 3 of the JTCC.

After January 1988 when FIA increased the weight multiplication factor from 1.4 to 1.7, the MK III lost competitiveness as the rest of the Division 3 cars were mostly running 2.0 or 2.5 L engines, increasing weight differences. Additionally, unreliable long-stroke engines, homologation delays and poor development caused a further decline of the car as the Ford Sierra Cosworth RS500 and the more advanced Nissan Skyline GT-R became the cars to have in top flight Group A racing.

Among all the private teams that competed with the Mk III Group A Supra (RAS-Belgium, MIL-UK, and Bemani-Switzerland), the Swiss team was the most successful. This was largely due to the team founder Beni Bühler, who was very much aware of the multiplication factor changes as early as July 1987 and thus made the right choice to develop a naturally aspirated 7M-GE-powered MA70 Supra.

With financial support from Walter Frey (Toyota Switzerland), Bemani entered the European Touring Car Championship (ETCC) with two cars, consistently achieving finishes just behind the factory teams. At the Group A endurance race—the Spa 24 Hours—Bemani secured 5th place overall and 3rd in their class.

In the 1989 and 1990 seasons, Bemani entered the Deutsche Tourenwagen Meisterschaft (DTM). However, competing against the dominance of BMW and Mercedes proved extremely challenging. Despite the Toyota Supra 3.0i’s impressive 330 horsepower, the team struggled to be competitive and non delivery of the promised budget in millions from Toyota Germany did not help. Notable highlights included briefly leading a heat race at Mainz-Finthen and running 2nd at AVUS before the AMG team forced the Toyota out of the race after direct order from their Team Principle.

Despite the significant aerodynamic advantage and double wishbone suspension - the Gr.A Mk III Supra Factory race effort was largely discontinued at the end of the 1990 season in favour of the Toyota Corolla AE101. For the 1991 and 1992 only a few race cars were kept in competition by privateers including top finishes by Bemani Toyota Team in the Swiss Group A Championship.

The GR Supra made its debut in the 2026 Supercars Championship (Australia) with a Hilux Dakar-derived 2UR-GSE V8 engine.

== Production Car racing ==
Peter Fitzgerald won the 1989 Australian Production Car Championship driving a Toyota Supra Turbo.

== Rallying ==
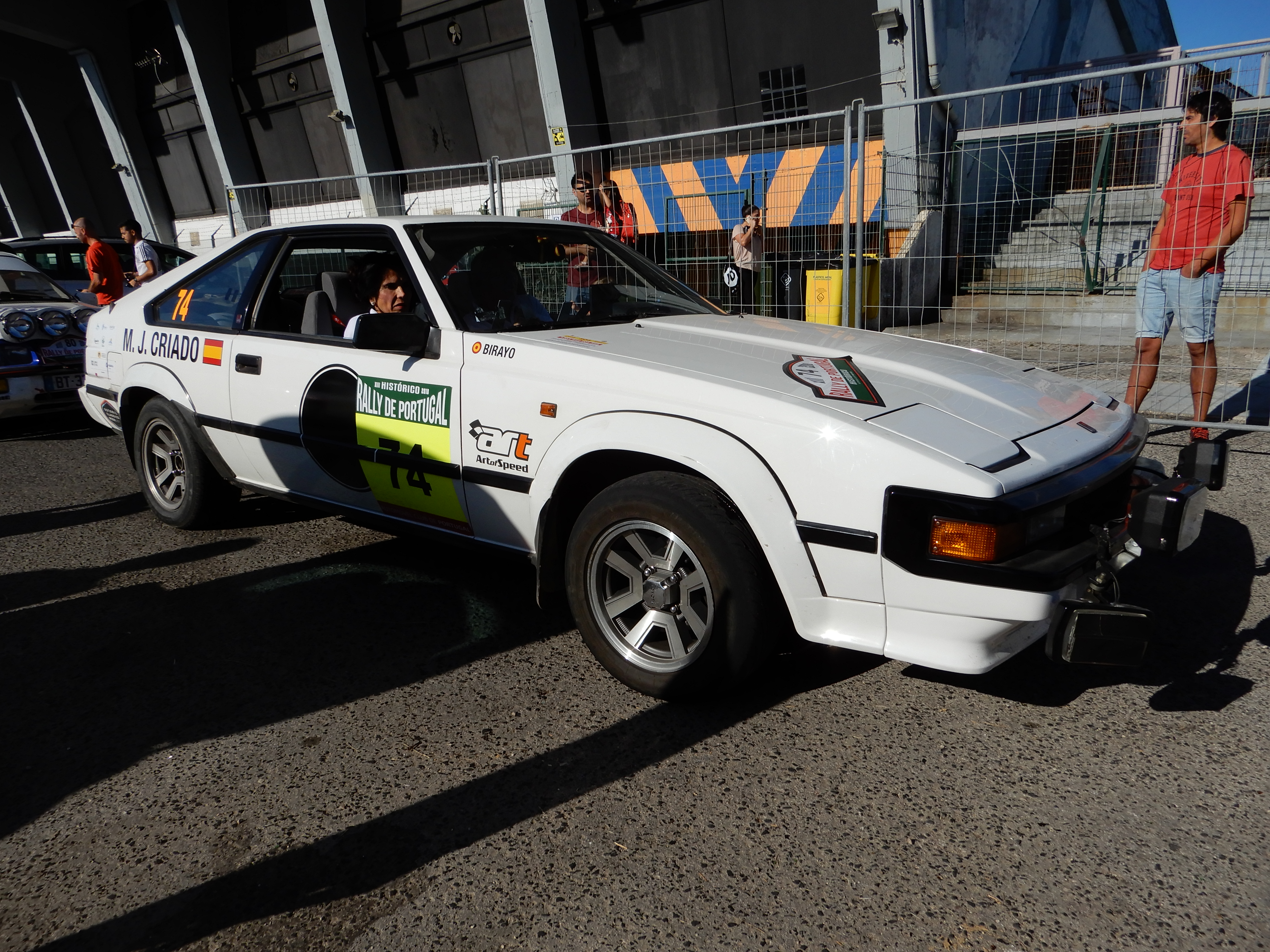
1982 Mk II Supra used in the Rally de Portugal

Although the Celica and Corolla Levin represented Toyota in rallying, the touring car spec Celica Supra was used occasionally in Group A with modifications to make it drivable. The Celica Supra managed to finish second in category at Circuit of Ireland Ulster Rally, Scottish Rally and the Welsh Rally during the 1983 British Open Rally Championship, driven by Per Eklund and Dave Whittock, allowing them to successfully defend their championship title.

Toyota sold the car off after the 1985 season.

Following the demise of Group B and upon insistence by Toyota management, its rally entrant Toyota Team Europe used the Supra to specialize in African rallies while the lighter Celica took the job for the other rallies. The Supra 3.0i made Toyota's Group A debut with the Supra which was capable of producing 216 kW (290 bhp), despite its weight and size being a clear disadvantage, driven by Björn Waldegaard, it led the 1987 Safari Rally until its final day when its engine overheated. The Supra scored its only win in the Hong Kong - Beijing Rally with the same driver. The NA version was shortly replaced by the 300 kW (400 bhp) turbo version, which on its debut at the Rallye Côte d'Ivoire, the Supra led but the team withdrew when their hired Cessna 340 crashed, killing the team manager, Henry Liddon and his assistant, Nigel Harris, plus a pilot and navigator. TTE would return for its African attempt for the following two years but was unable to repeat its performance and was replaced by the Celica which achieved better successes there.

A naturally aspirated, privately entered A80 Supra competed in SCCA ProRally series in 1996 to 1998.

== Sports car racing ==
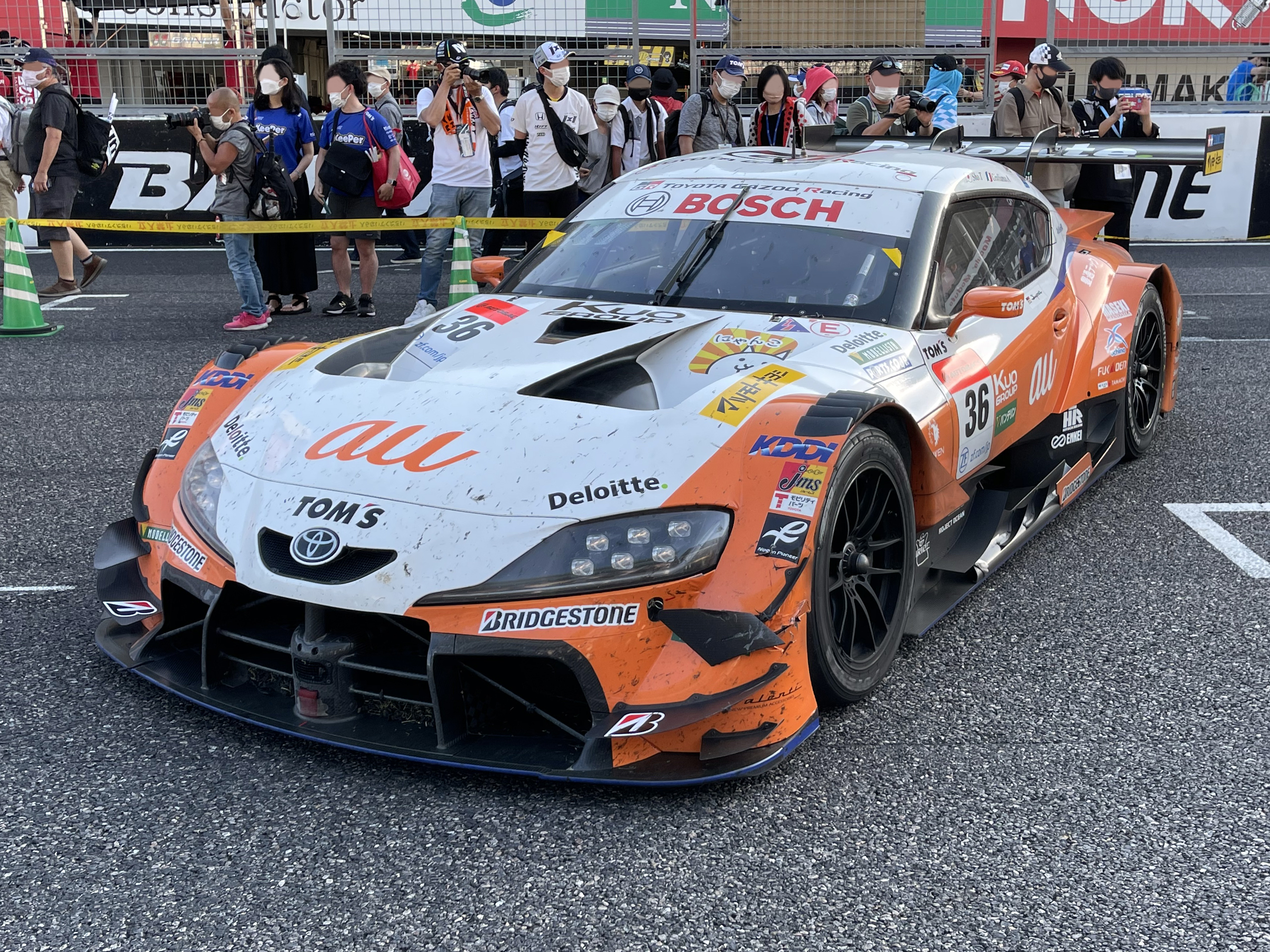
2021 Super GT championship-winning TGR Team au Tom's Supra

The Supra has a long history of professional sports car racing, mainly in Japan and the United States. The Supra has been raced in many different sports car racing championships over the years, most notably in the JGTC, Super GT, IMSA, GT4, and 24 Hours of Le Mans.

=== IMSA ===
The Mk III Supra, which replaced the Mk II Celica, competed in the IMSA Camel GT series by Kent Racing and All American Racers in 1983 in the GTU (Grand Touring, under 3.0-liter) category, later in the season, AAR inherited the racing program of Kent Racing, although superior to the AAR cars, the semi-tube frame car Kent Racing used housed a 220 kW (300 hp), 2030 cc, 16-valve DOHC engine. Feeling that the car needs to be developed, it underwent further redesign by aerodynamicist Hiro Fujimori.

For the 1985 season, AAR specially adapted a 2.1-liter turbocharged 4T-GT engine to one of their GTU car to be used at the GTO category, which scored a win at Laguna Seca, that car would later be used for engine development. Despite heavy competition against the RX-7s, by the time they progressed to the higher GTO category in 1986 with a Celica, they had taken 10 GTU victories.

=== GT4 ===
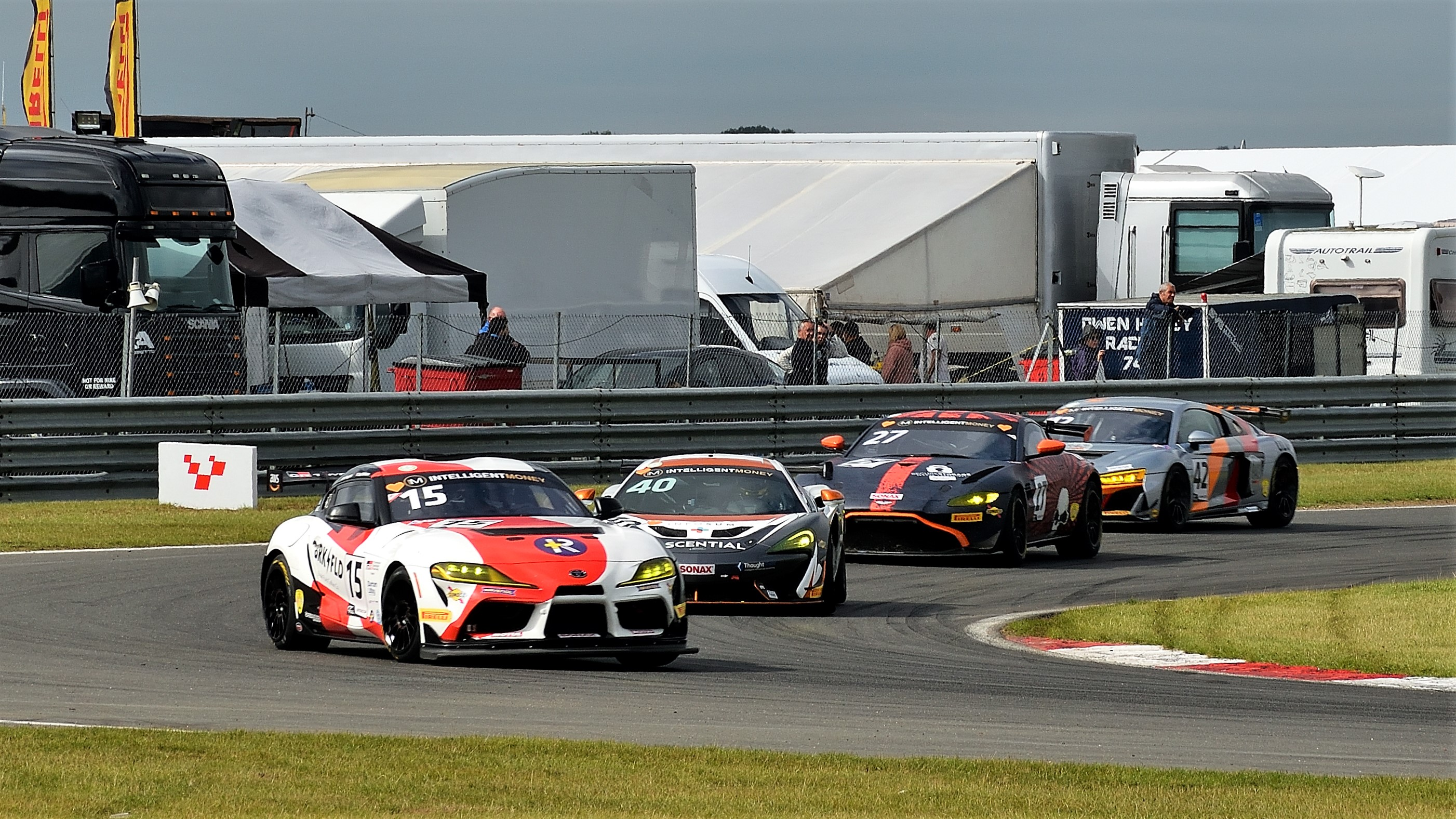
GR Supra GT4 racing at Snetterton Circuit in 2021

The Toyota GR Supra GT4 was designed and produced by Toyota Gazoo Racing Europe GmbH in Cologne, Germany that was designed for the SRO GT4 category. Launched in 2020, the first customers of this car were Classic & Modern Racing, Speedworks Motorsport and Ring Racing. It is powered by a 3-liter twin-turbo engine which produces 320 kW (430 hp) and 650 N⋅m (480 lbf⋅ft), using a seven-speed automatic gearbox with rear-wheel drive. Toyota released the updated GR Supra GT4 in 2022, named the GR Supra GT4 EVO, with upgrades focused on engine performance, handling, and braking. The engine was updated with increased power, an updated torque curve with maximum torque of up to 660 N⋅m (487 lb⋅ft), and improved cooling.

As of 2022, more than 50 GR Supra GT4 cars have been used in GT4 class races. They have earned victories in 11 national and international GT4 championships, and over 100 podium finishes. In August 2022, the GR Supra GT4 earned its 50th class win in a major championship, at the GT World Challenge Asia at Sportsland Sugo in Japan.

=== U.S. Super Lap Battles ===
Matt Andrews piloted Curtis Chen's Mk IV Supra to a win at the 2008 Super Lap Battle Finals in the Street RWD division with a time of 1:57:711. Previously his car took home overall street class in 2006.

=== Magazine Challenges ===
Matt Andrews and Al Rhee piloted Curtis Chen's Mk IV Supra in the road racing and drag racing tests representing Super Street Magazine for the 2010 Castrol Syntec Top Car Challenge. The Team came in first place followed by a Modified R35 GTR.

=== JGTC/Super GT ===
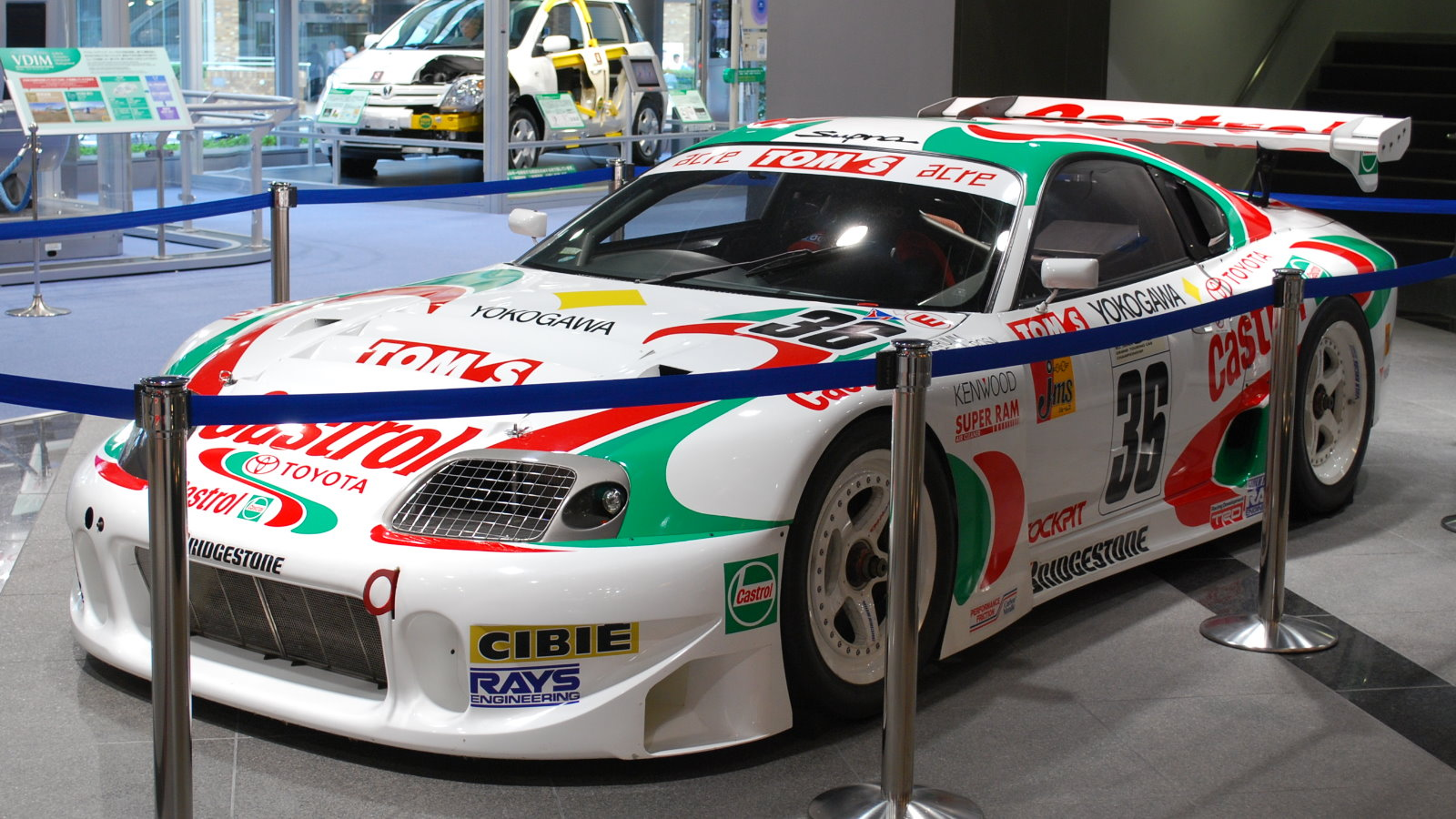
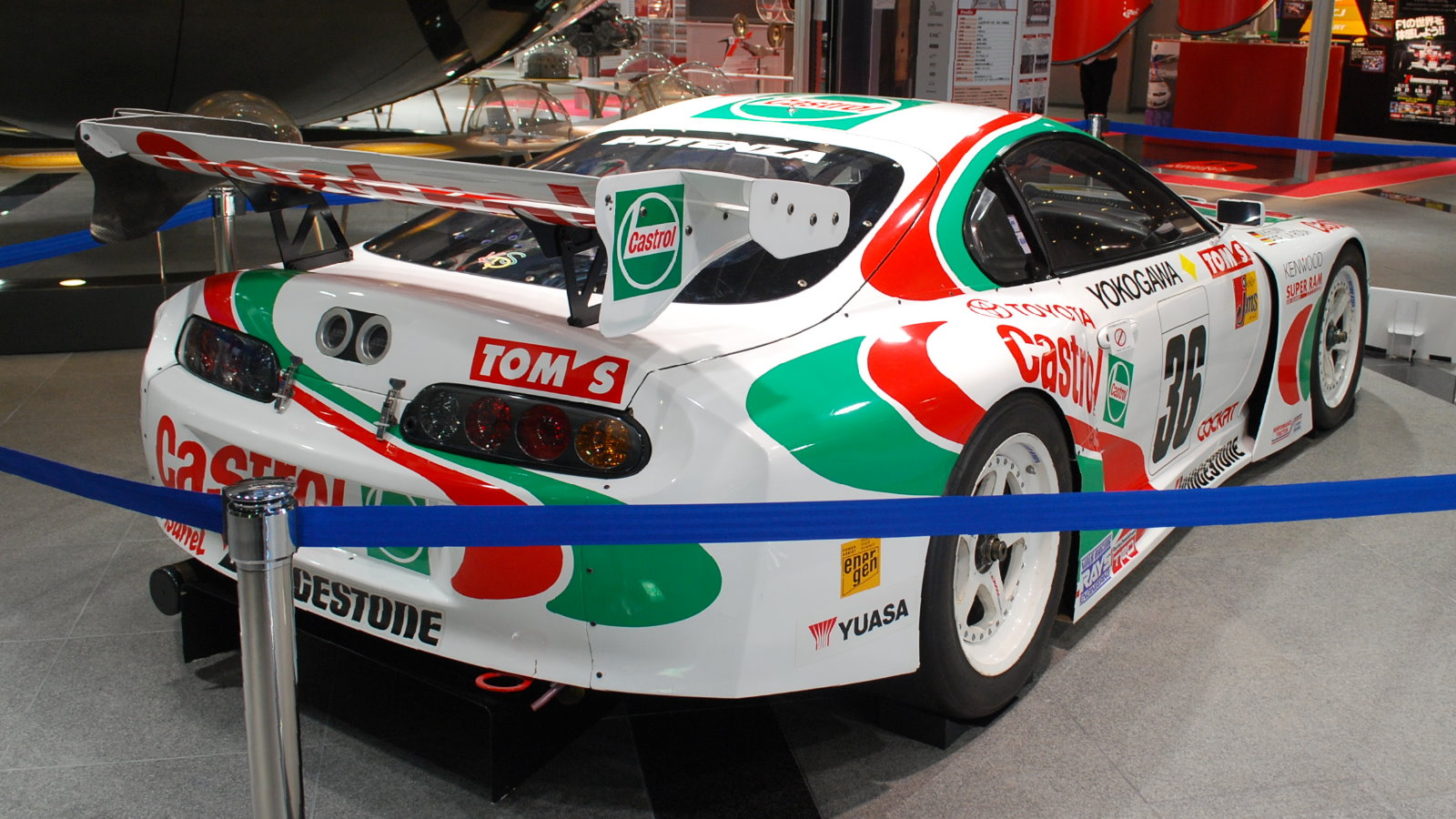
1997 JGTC championship-winning Castrol TOM'S Supra GT

Since first appearing in 1994, Toyota has raced the JZA80 Supra as a GT500 race car in the JGTC series. Beginning with a four-cylinder 2.1-liter turbocharged 503E (3S-GT) mounted onto a stock bodyshell with wide arch body kit and spoiler. Over the years, as demands for expensive GT1 race specials became common, the JGTC regulation drifted away from FIA rules, as a result, the Supra has progressively undergone numerous changes over the years, most noticeable, the numerous body changes and by the late 1990s, the Supra used a developed version of the 3SG, which was developed from the IMSA engine and similar to the 3SGTE engine found in the Toyota Corolla WRC car. By the early 2000s, for the benefit of torque, the Supra moved on to 3UZ-FE V8 engine.

Altogether, the Supra has taken the drivers' title five times in 1997, 2001, 2002, 2005, and 2021, and the teams' title two times in 1997 and 1999. Despite being out of production since 2002, factory teams continued to use JZA80 Supras with continued successes. The car's swansong competitive year was in 2006, when it was used by Toyota Team Tsuchiya and Toyota Team SARD. From 2007 till 2019, Toyota was represented in the GT500 by its luxury brand Lexus and its line of GT cars, such as the SC430 and LC500. However, from 2020 onwards, Toyota began using the Supra again in both the GT500 and GT300 series.

In 2000, the Falken team entered the 24 Hours Nürburgring race with the 2-liter turbo version. Modified for the race around the clock the car made it up to the 6th place when an accident ended its race in the early morning.

In 2020, the Supra returned to the GT500 class in Super GT, replacing the Lexus LC. GT300 team Saitama Toyopet GreenBrave also introduced a V8 engined GT300-spec Supra for 2020, replacing the Mark X that the team had fielded since 2017. Both GT500 and GT300 iterations took victory in their respective classes at the first race of the 2020 season in Fuji.

In the 2021 Super GT Series, the Toyota Supra GT500 raced by TGR Team au Tom's won the 2021 Championship in the GT500 class, driven by Yuhi Sekiguchi and Sho Tsuboi. The team overcame a 16-point deficit in the final round of the season to win the championship.

The 2023 Super GT Series resulted in championship victories for the Toyota GR Supra in both classes. The GR Supra GT500 raced by TGR Team au TOM'S won the championship in the GT500 class, driven by Sho Tsuboi and Ritomo Miyata, while the GR Supra GT300 raced by Saitama Green Brave won the championship in the GT300 class, driven by Hiroki Yoshida and Kohta Kawaai.

Again in 2024, TGR Team au TOM'S won the championship in the GT500 class for a consecutive year, with drivers Sho Tsuboi and Ritomo Miyata.

=== Le Mans ===
The JGTC specification Supra by the factory-backed SARD team made its Le Mans debut in 1995 where it finished 14th, the team returned again for the following year which they did not finish.

== Supra HV-R ==
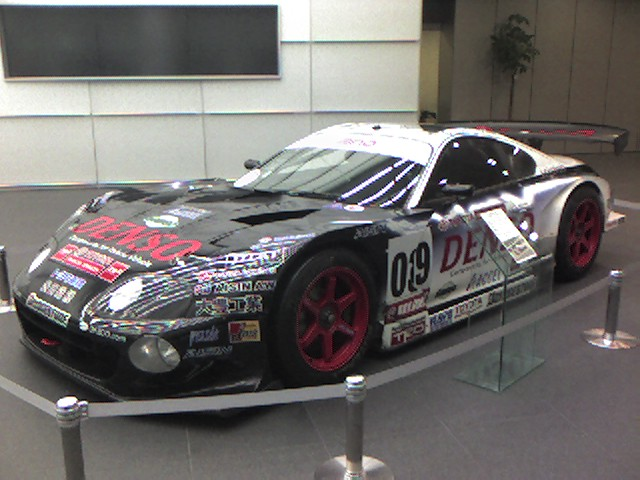
Toyota Supra HV-R

The Supra HV-R is a hybrid race car based on the Super GT Supra jointly developed by Toyota and Toyota Team SARD. The four-wheel drive HV-R combines a 4.5 L V8 (358 kW, 480 hp) from its Super GT UZ-FE engine, a rear-axle-mounted electric motor (150 kW; 200 hp), and two front in-wheel electric motors (10 kW; 13 PS; 13 hp each) to generate over 520 kW (700 hp). The car weighs 1,080 kg (2,380 lb).

The Denso SARD Supra HV-R became the first hybrid race car in history to win a race when Toyota Team SARD took first place in the Tokachi 24-hour, a Super Taikyu race, on July 16, 2007. The car completed 616 laps, 19 laps ahead of the second-place finisher.

== Drifting ==
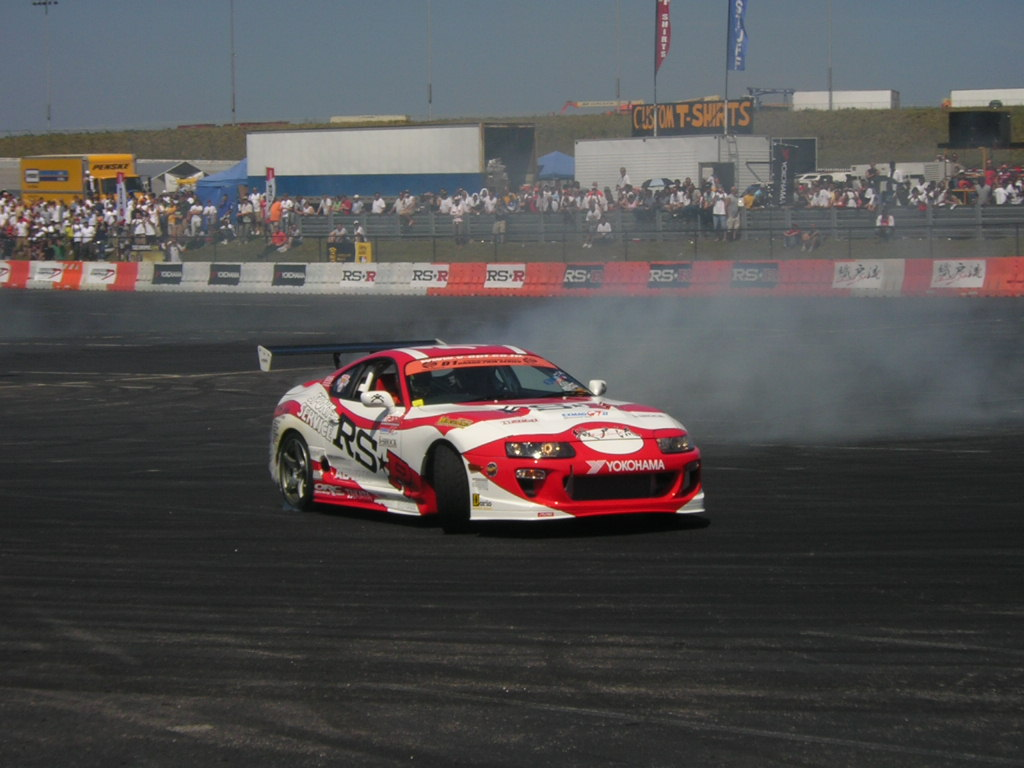
Max Orido drifting a RS-R Supra at NOPI Nationals 2005

Toyota Supra was used for top level drifting events, most notably Manabu Orido, the D1GP judge turned competitor, who, for personal reasons, chose the JZA80 to be his personal car and his own racecar of Super GT series and Rhys Millen, who briefly converted his Supra race car for use in drift events before selling it on and switching to the works Pontiac GTO. Fredric Aasbø has been driving Supras in both Norwegian and US drifting events since 2008, Mark Luney has also prepared a high-powered Supra to compete within UK events in 2010. Some of the most notorious Supras built for drifting in Europe belong to the Russian owned team called Evil Empire, with its headquarters in Sankt Petersburg, and Sergey Kabargin as one of the main drivers.

Orido's JZA80 consisted of many parts from his JGTC racer including the tail lights, doors and foot pedals and boasts of over 522 kW (700 bhp) outputted from a modified 3.4 liter engine, but is set up to run at 447 kW (600 bhp) for reliability. The body work design is designed by fellow D1GP commentator Manabu Suzuki. During the 2005 season, Orido finished 12th overall, managing a second-place finish at Ebisu and two other points finishes. His professional drifting career ended abruptly during a transportation accident, when en route to an Advan Drift Meeting, a sleeping truck driver collided into the back of the truck containing the RS-R Supra, severely damaging the car's front end. When informed, Orido was relieved as he saw it as an opportunity to end his drifting career as it took up a lot of his time.

In 2010, a year after Orido returned to D1GP with his Aristo, he once again switched to the JZA80 Supra as his drift car, driving it for two seasons until 2012, where he moved to his current drift car, the new Toyota 86. During his second run with the Supra, Orido did considerably better compared to his 1st achieving a second-place finish at Okayama and 8th overall in 2010, and 13th overall in 2011 where he also scored a half-points victory at Autopolis, his first recorded victory in D1GP, due to Orido finishing 1st in the qualifying stage after the tsuiso battles were halted because of heavy rain.

Orido's 2005 RS-R Supra also made appearances outside Japan, with Ken Gushi driving the car during the Formula D Invitational Event at Abu Dhabi in 2011, and Orido driving the car again during the first two rounds of the Formula Drift Asia in 2012, with Fredric Aasbø driving the car for the third and last round.

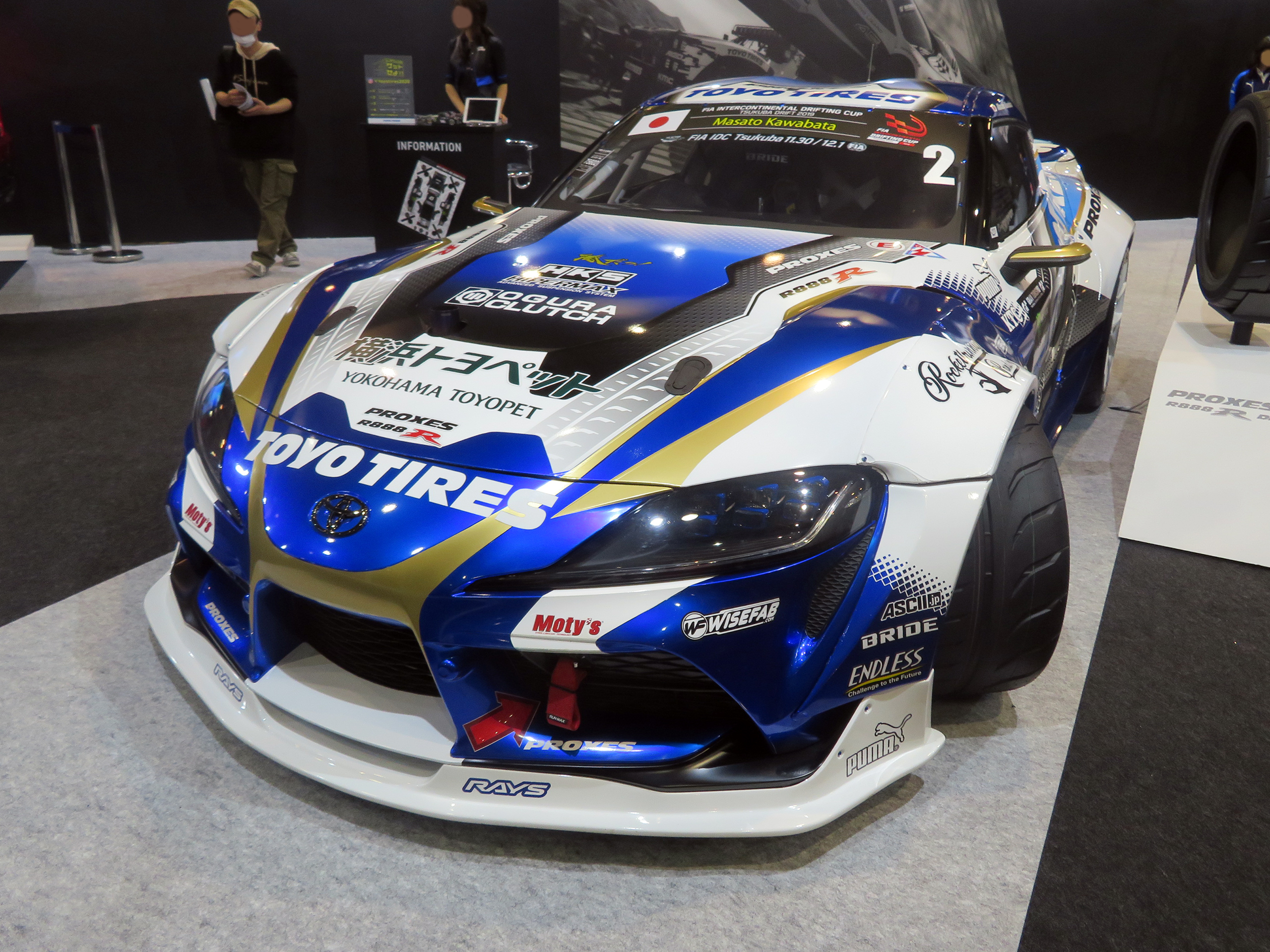
D1GP Team Toyo Tires Supra

On 13 March 2019, Toyota Gazoo Racing announced that it would be sponsoring the first fifth-generation GR Supra in the D1 Grand Prix production car drifting series, raced by Daigo Saito and Team Fat Five Racing (later rebranded as TMAR) for the 2019 season onwards. Team Toyo Tires also announced that they will be joining in using the GR Supra, driven by Masato Kawabata, from 2019 onwards. Other teams such as Team Yokohama Toyopet, Car Guy Racing, and SPAN Racing also later elected to use the GR Supra platform for their race teams.

In March 2020, the first GR Supra for the Formula Drift drifting series was unveiled by Papadakis Racing in partnership with Toyota Gazoo Racing. It was powered by a modified B58 engine producing over 750 kW (1,000 hp) and was driven by Fredric Aasbø. In November 2020, another GR Supra for Formula D was unveiled by GReddy Performance, powered by a modified B58 powerplant producing 600 kW (800 hp), and driven by Ken Gushi. Both Formula D GR Supras were featured by Toyota at the 2020 SEMA show, and have competed in Formula D since 2020. Team Huragan Racing's Oleksii Holovnia also began piloting a GR Supra in 2023.

Aasbø went on to win the 2021 and 2022 Formula D Championship driving the GR Supra, winning five individual rounds since 2020. Strong performances by the GR Supra in Formula D have also helped Toyota win the overall Formula D Auto Cup in both 2021 and 2022.

Goran Burmudžija uses a third generation Supra in the Serbian Drift Championship.

== Stock car racing ==
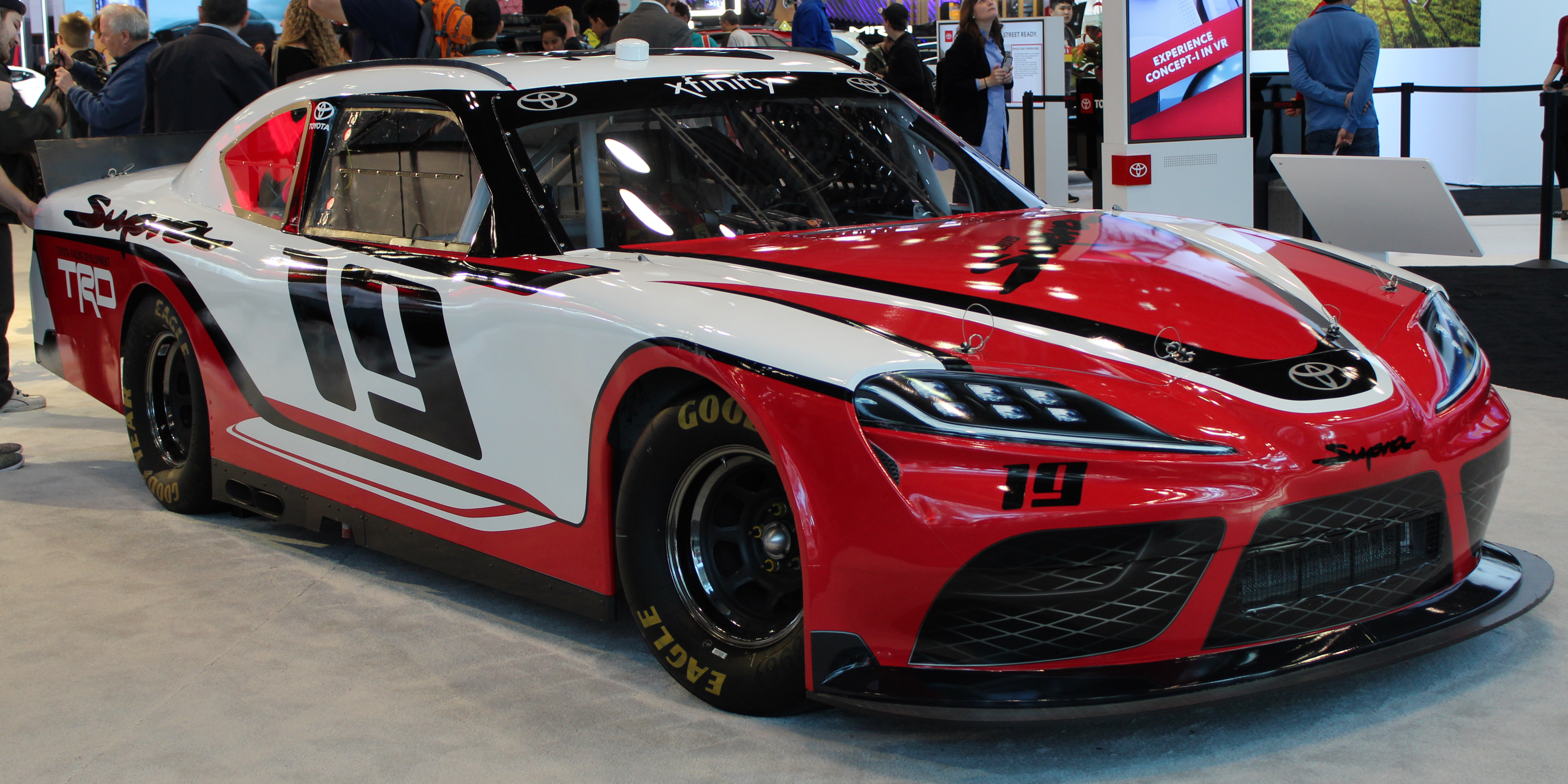

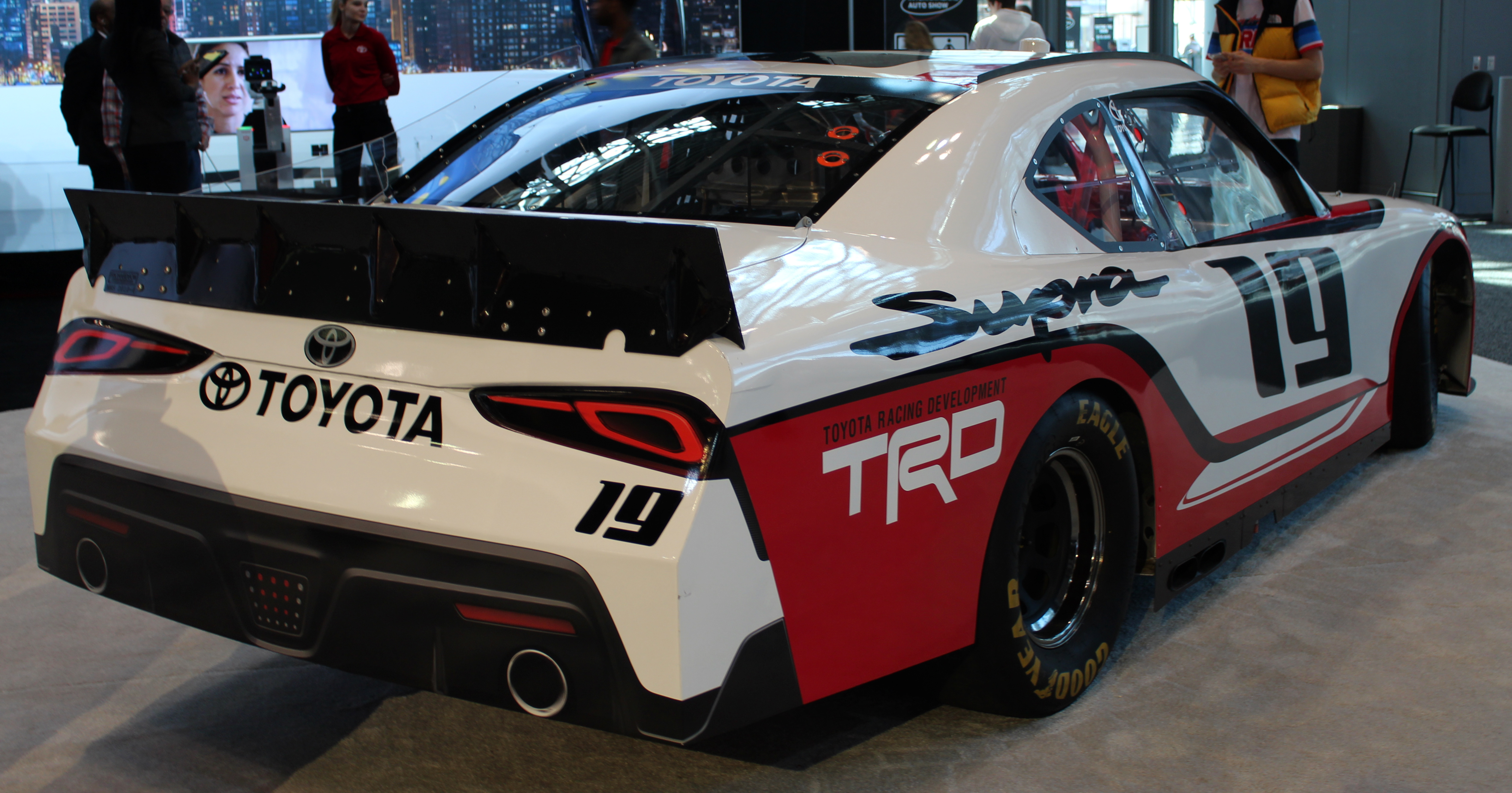
2019 Toyota Supra NASCAR Xfinity Series race car

On July 5, 2018, Toyota announced that the fifth generation Supra will replace the Camry in the 2019 NASCAR Xfinity Series in the US.

On February 23, 2019, Christopher Bell of Joe Gibbs Racing scored the Supra's first NASCAR win at Atlanta. The Supra has won two Xfinity Series championships: 2021 with Daniel Hemric and 2022 with Ty Gibbs.

Despite the announcement that this generation of the production model Supra will be discontinued by March 2026, Toyota will continue to field the Supra-bodied stock car in the US based Xfinity Series for the foreseeable future.

== Time attack and speed records ==
Tuning companies and race teams have often used the Toyota Supra in time attack and speed record motorsport applications, mainly in Japan since the 1980s.

In 1983, HKS developed the HKS M300, a highly tuned second generation Celica XX (XX being the Supra's Japan name) with a twin-turbocharged 5M-GE engine, to set speed records. The M300 became the first ever Japanese automobile to exceed 300 km/h (186 mph) with a speed record of 301.25 km/h (187.19 mph)) at the Yatabe proving grounds in 1983.

In 1993, the HKS T-001, a modified Supra Mk IV, was developed for time attack and speed trials. It produced over 535 kW (730 PS; 720 hp), reached 344 km/h (214 mph), and set a lap time at the Tsukuba Circuit of 1 minute 1.97 seconds.

Since 1994, Smokey Nagata and team Top Secret have participated in speed trials and speed challenges such as 0–400 km/h (0-249 mph), 0–300 km/h (0-186 mph), 1000m, and top speed challenges using specialized Mk IV Supras. Nagata notoriously performed many illegal speed runs on public roads, including 341 km/h (212 mph) on the Autobahn (Germany), 358 km/h (222 mph) on Nardò (Italy) with a Top Secret V12 Supra, and 317 km/h (197 mph) on public roads in the UK with a Top Secret Supra MKIV. In 2008 at the Nardò Ring in Italy, the Top Secret V12 Supra set a top speed of 358.2 km/h (222.6 mph), powered by a swapped 1GZ-FE engine (from a Toyota Century) with dual HKS GT2835 ball bearing turbochargers and tuned to 695 kW (930 hp) and 1,010 N⋅m (745 lb⋅ft) of torque.

In 2023, Masahiro Sasaki set a lap time of 58.038 seconds at the Tsukuba Circuit in the fifth-generation GR Supra tuned by Screen and D2 Racing.

== Nürburgring history ==
The Toyota Supra has been used to set lap times at the Nürburgring Nordschleife, by both Toyota as well as aftermarket tuners.

Japanese tuning company BLITZ teamed up with Racelogic of the United Kingdom to take on the non-series/non-road-legal class Nürburgring time in 1997 – they beat it by 4 seconds with a time of 7:49.40 and claimed the title. It was claimed to be capable of 750 PS (552 kW; 740 hp) but ran on 606 bhp (452 kW; 614 PS) when the time was recorded.

Time	Vehicle	Driver	Issue, (Date of Test), Notes
7:49.40	BLITZ Toyota Supra	Herbert Schürg	1997
7:52.17	Toyota GR Supra (A90/J29)	Christian Gebhardt	2019-08-22
