= 2026 Fresh From Florida 250 =

NASCAR Craftsman Truck Series race at Daytona International Speedway

Race details
- Race 1 of 25 of the 2026 NASCAR Craftsman Truck Series
- Date: February 13, 2026
- Location: Daytona International Speedway in Daytona Beach, Florida
- Course: Permanent racing facility
- Course length: 2.5 miles (4.023 km)
- Distance: 102 laps, 255 mi (410.383 km)
- Scheduled distance: 100 laps, 250 mi (402.336 km)
- Average speed: 121.429 miles per hour (195.421 km/h)

Pole position
Driver	Ty Majeski	ThorSport Racing
- Time: 50.881

Most laps led
Drivers	Carson Hocevar	Spire Motorsports
	Michael McDowell	Spire Motorsports
	Justin Haley	Kaulig Racing
- Laps: 20

Fastest lap
Driver	Daniel Hemric	McAnally–Hilgemann Racing
- Time: 46.479

Winner
No. 38	Chandler Smith	Front Row Motorsports

Television in the United States
- Network: FS1
- Announcers: Jamie Little, Kevin Harvick, Joey Logano, and Dana White (Stage 2)

Radio in the United States
- Radio: NRN
- Booth announcers: Alex Hayden and Mike Bagley
- Turn announcers: Dave Moody (1 & 2), Kyle Rickey (Backstretch), and Tim Catalfamo (3 & 4)

The 2026 Fresh From Florida 250 was a NASCAR Craftsman Truck Series race held on February 13, 2026, at Daytona International Speedway in Daytona Beach, Florida. Contested over 102 laps—extended from 100 laps due to an overtime finish on the 2.5-mile (4.0-kilometre) superspeedway, it was the first race of the 2026 NASCAR Craftsman Truck Series season, and the 27th running of the event.

In the overtime finish, Chandler Smith, driving for Front Row Motorsports, made a four-wide tri-oval pass underneath John Hunter Nemechek on the final lap to earn his eighth career NASCAR Craftsman Truck Series win, and his first of the season. Gio Ruggiero finished second, and Christian Eckes finished third. Ty Majeski and Nemechek rounded out the top five, while Ricky Stenhouse Jr., Brenden Queen, Kaden Honeycutt, Tyler Ankrum, and Stewart Friesen rounded out the top ten. The race also produced the most lead changes in series history, with 32 lead changes among 12 drivers.

== Report ==
=== Background ===
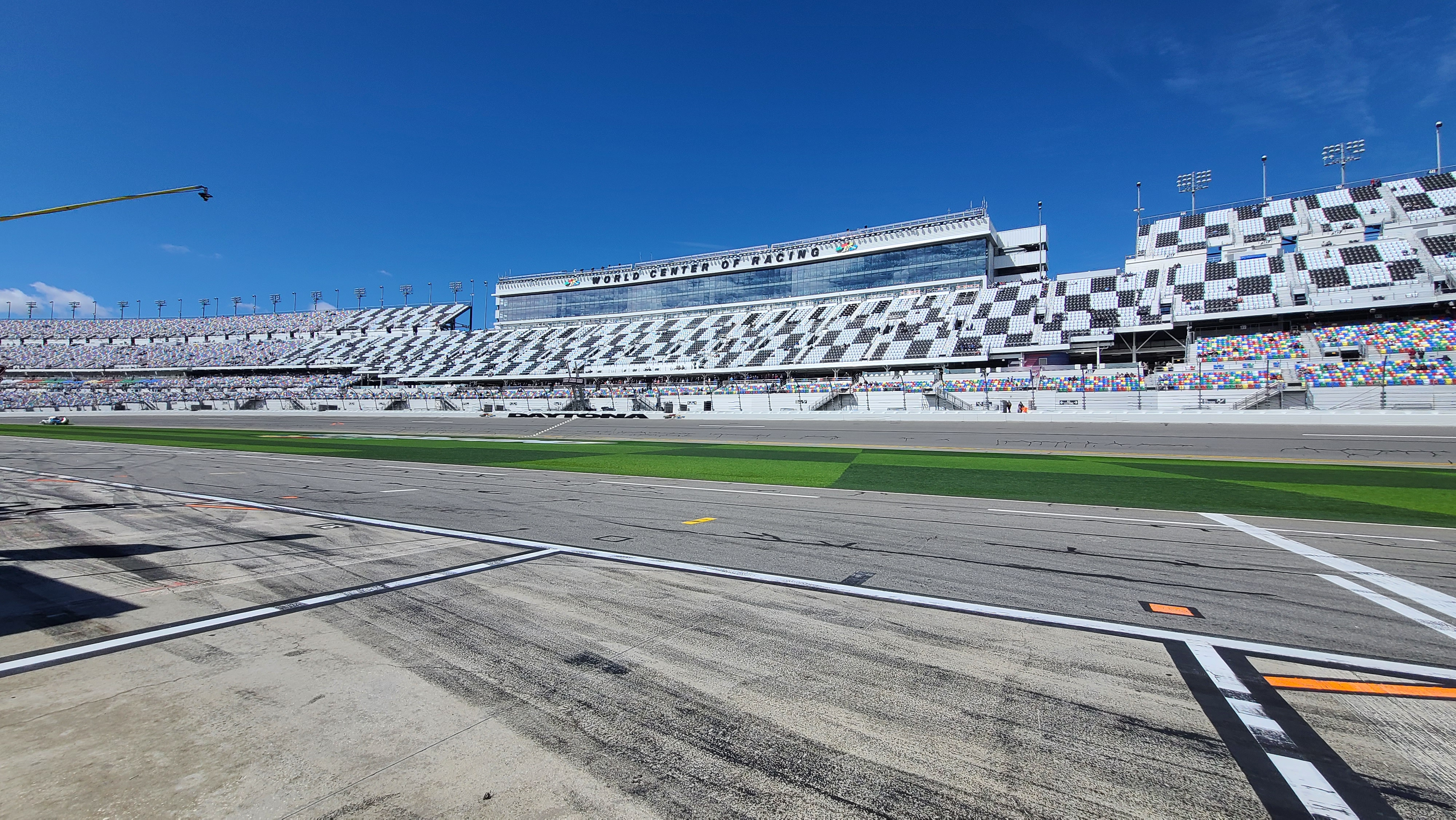
Daytona International Speedway, the track where the race was held.

Daytona International Speedway is one of three superspeedways to hold NASCAR races, the other two being Atlanta Motor Speedway and Talladega Superspeedway. The standard track at Daytona International Speedway is a four-turn superspeedway that is 2.5 miles (4.0 kilometres) long. The track's turns are banked at 31 degrees, while the front stretch, the location of the finish line, is banked at 18 degrees.

==== Entry list ====
- (R) denotes rookie driver.
- (i) denotes driver who is ineligible for series driver points.

#	Driver	Team	Make
1	Taylor Gray (i)	Tricon Garage	Toyota
2	Jason White	Team Reaume	Ford
4	Garrett Mitchell	Niece Motorsports	Chevrolet
5	Nick Leitz	Tricon Garage	Toyota
6	Norm Benning	Norm Benning Racing	Chevrolet
7	Michael McDowell (i)	Spire Motorsports	Chevrolet
9	Grant Enfinger	CR7 Motorsports	Chevrolet
10	Daniel Dye	Kaulig Racing	Ram
11	Kaden Honeycutt	Tricon Garage	Toyota
12	Brenden Queen (R)	Kaulig Racing	Ram
13	Cole Butcher (R)	ThorSport Racing	Ford
14	Mini Tyrrell (R)	Kaulig Racing	Ram
15	Tanner Gray	Tricon Garage	Toyota
16	Justin Haley	Kaulig Racing	Ram
17	Gio Ruggiero	Tricon Garage	Toyota
18	Tyler Ankrum	McAnally–Hilgemann Racing	Chevrolet
19	Daniel Hemric	McAnally–Hilgemann Racing	Chevrolet
22	Josh Reaume	Team Reaume	Ford
25	Tony Stewart	Kaulig Racing	Ram
26	Dawson Sutton	Rackley W.A.R.	Chevrolet
27	Toni Breidinger	Rackley W.A.R.	Chevrolet
28	Bryan Dauzat	FDNY Racing	Chevrolet
33	Frankie Muniz	Team Reaume	Ford
34	Layne Riggs	Front Row Motorsports	Ford
35	Greg Van Alst	Greg Van Alst Motorsports	Chevrolet
38	Chandler Smith	Front Row Motorsports	Ford
42	Travis Pastrana	Niece Motorsports	Chevrolet
44	Andrés Pérez de Lara	Niece Motorsports	Chevrolet
45	Ricky Stenhouse Jr. (i)	Niece Motorsports	Chevrolet
52	Stewart Friesen	Halmar Friesen Racing	Toyota
56	Timmy Hill	Hill Motorsports	Toyota
62	John Hunter Nemechek (i)	Halmar Friesen Racing	Toyota
69	Tyler Tomassi	MBM Motorsports	Ford
75	Corey LaJoie (i)	Henderson Motorsports	Chevrolet
76	Spencer Boyd	Freedom Racing Enterprises	Chevrolet
77	Carson Hocevar (i)	Spire Motorsports	Chevrolet
81	Kris Wright	McAnally–Hilgemann Racing	Chevrolet
88	Ty Majeski	ThorSport Racing	Ford
90	Justin Carroll	TC Motorsports	Chevrolet
91	Christian Eckes	McAnally–Hilgemann Racing	Chevrolet
95	Clay Greenfield	GK Racing	Chevrolet
97	Jason Kitzmiller	CR7 Motorsports	Chevrolet
98	Jake Garcia	ThorSport Racing	Ford
99	Ben Rhodes	ThorSport Racing	Ford
Official entry list

== Practice ==
The first and only practice session was held on Thursday, February 12, at 5:00 PM EST, and lasted for 50 minutes.

Kaden Honeycutt, driving for Tricon Garage, set the fastest time in the session, with a lap of 48.439 seconds, and a speed of 185.801 miles per hour (299.018 km/h).

=== Practice results ===
Pos.	#	Driver	Team	Make	Time	Speed
1	11	Kaden Honeycutt	Tricon Garage	Toyota	48.439	185.801
2	1	Taylor Gray (i)	Tricon Garage	Toyota	48.448	185.766
3	9	Grant Enfinger	CR7 Motorsports	Chevrolet	49.449	185.762
Full practice results

== Qualifying ==
Qualifying was held on Friday, February 13, at 3:00 PM EST. Since Daytona International Speedway is a superspeedway, the qualifying procedure used was a single-car, single-lap system with two rounds. In the first round, drivers had one lap to set a time and determined positions 11-36. The fastest ten drivers from the first round advanced to the second and final round, and whoever set the fastest time in Round 2 won the pole and determined the rest of the starting lineup.

Ty Majeski, driving for ThorSport Racing, qualified on pole position, having advanced from the preliminary round and set the fastest time in Round 2, with a lap of 50.881 seconds, and a speed of 176.883 miles per hour (284.666 km/h).

Seven drivers failed to qualify: Bryan Dauzat, Timmy Hill, Justin Carroll, Tyler Tomassi, Norm Benning, Toni Breidinger, and Greg Van Alst.

=== Qualifying results ===
Pos.	#	Driver	Team	Make	Time (R1)	Speed (R1)	Time (R2)	Speed (R2)
1	88	Ty Majeski	ThorSport Racing	Ford	50.941	176.675	50.881	176.883
2	7	Michael McDowell (i)	Spire Motorsports	Chevrolet	50.976	176.554	50.939	176.682
3	15	Tanner Gray	Tricon Garage	Toyota	51.035	176.350	51.074	176.215
4	77	Carson Hocevar (i)	Spire Motorsports	Chevrolet	50.979	176.543	51.112	176.084
5	9	Grant Enfinger	CR7 Motorsports	Chevrolet	51.153	175.943	51.168	175.891
6	18	Tyler Ankrum	McAnally–Hilgemann Racing	Chevrolet	51.337	175.312	51.177	175.860
7	11	Kaden Honeycutt	Tricon Garage	Toyota	50.998	176.478	51.229	175.682
8	98	Jake Garcia	ThorSport Racing	Ford	51.175	175.867	51.264	175.562
9	17	Gio Ruggiero	Tricon Garage	Toyota	51.330	175.336	51.285	175.490
10	38	Chandler Smith	Front Row Motorsports	Ford	51.422	175.022	51.317	175.380
Eliminated in Round 1
11	91	Christian Eckes	McAnally–Hilgemann Racing	Chevrolet	51.455	174.910	—	—
12	4	Garrett Mitchell	Niece Motorsports	Chevrolet	51.459	174.897	—	—
13	42	Travis Pastrana	Niece Motorsports	Chevrolet	51.488	174.798	—	—
14	1	Taylor Gray (i)	Tricon Garage	Toyota	51.508	174.730	—	—
15	25	Tony Stewart	Kaulig Racing	Ram	51.519	174.693	—	—
16	16	Justin Haley	Kaulig Racing	Ram	51.544	174.608	—	—
17	95	Clay Greenfield	GK Racing	Chevrolet	51.558	174.561	—	—
18	75	Corey LaJoie (i)	Henderson Motorsports	Chevrolet	51.559	174.557	—	—
19	62	John Hunter Nemechek (i)	Halmar Friesen Racing	Toyota	51.586	174.466	—	—
20	26	Dawson Sutton	Rackley W.A.R.	Chevrolet	51.607	174.395	—	—
21	97	Jason Kitzmiller	CR7 Motorsports	Chevrolet	51.611	174.381	—	—
22	12	Brenden Queen (R)	Kaulig Racing	Ram	51.614	174.371	—	—
23	13	Cole Butcher (R)	ThorSport Racing	Ford	51.643	174.273	—	—
24	52	Stewart Friesen	Halmar Friesen Racing	Toyota	51.664	174.203	—	—
25	5	Nick Leitz	Tricon Garage	Toyota	51.674	174.169	—	—
26	81	Kris Wright	McAnally–Hilgemann Racing	Chevrolet	51.714	174.034	—	—
27	99	Ben Rhodes	ThorSport Racing	Ford	51.719	174.017	—	—
28	44	Andrés Pérez de Lara	Niece Motorsports	Chevrolet	51.751	173.910	—	—
29	22	Josh Reaume	Team Reaume	Ford	51.752	173.906	—	—
30	45	Ricky Stenhouse Jr. (i)	Niece Motorsports	Chevrolet	51.786	173.792	—	—
31	10	Daniel Dye	Kaulig Racing	Ram	51.789	173.782	—	—
Qualified by owner's points
32	19	Daniel Hemric	McAnally–Hilgemann Racing	Chevrolet	51.861	173.541	—	—
33	33	Frankie Muniz	Team Reaume	Ford	51.863	173.534	—	—
34	76	Spencer Boyd	Freedom Racing Enterprises	Chevrolet	51.875	173.494	—	—
35	34	Layne Riggs	Front Row Motorsports	Ford	51.995	173.094	—	—
36	2	Jason White	Team Reaume	Ford	52.022	173.004	—	—
Qualified by OEM provisional
37	14	Mini Tyrrell (R)	Kaulig Racing	Ram	51.810	173.712	—	—
Failed to qualify
38	28	Bryan Dauzat	FDNY Racing	Chevrolet	51.900	173.410	—	—
39	56	Timmy Hill	Hill Motorsports	Toyota	51.943	173.267	—	—
40	90	Justin Carroll	TC Motorsports	Chevrolet	52.001	173.074	—	—
41	69	Tyler Tomassi	MBM Motorsports	Ford	52.010	173.044	—	—
42	6	Norm Benning	Norm Benning Racing	Chevrolet	52.109	172.715	—	—
43	27	Toni Breidinger	Rackley W.A.R.	Chevrolet	52.148	172.586	—	—
44	35	Greg Van Alst	Greg Van Alst Motorsports	Chevrolet	52.415	171.707	—	—
Official qualifying results
Official starting lineup

== Race ==
=== Race results ===
==== Stage results ====
Stage One Laps: 20

Pos.	#	Driver	Team	Make	Pts
1	77	Carson Hocevar (i)	Spire Motorsports	Chevrolet	0
2	15	Tanner Gray	Tricon Garage	Toyota	9
3	91	Christian Eckes	McAnally–Hilgemann Racing	Chevrolet	8
4	62	John Hunter Nemechek (i)	Halmar Friesen Racing	Toyota	0
5	7	Michael McDowell (i)	Spire Motorsports	Chevrolet	0
6	11	Kaden Honeycutt	Tricon Garage	Toyota	5
7	88	Ty Majeski	ThorSport Racing	Ford	4
8	1	Taylor Gray (i)	Tricon Garage	Toyota	0
9	12	Brendan Queen (R)	Kaulig Racing	Ram	2
10	9	Grant Enfinger	CR7 Motorsports	Chevrolet	1

Stage Two Laps: 20

Pos.	#	Driver	Team	Make	Pts
1	38	Chandler Smith	Front Row Motorsports	Ford	10
2	34	Layne Riggs	Front Row Motorsports	Ford	9
3	88	Ty Majeski	ThorSport Racing	Ford	8
4	1	Taylor Gray (i)	Tricon Garage	Toyota	0
5	7	Michael McDowell (i)	Spire Motorsports	Chevrolet	0
6	5	Nick Leitz	Tricon Garage	Toyota	5
7	91	Christian Eckes	McAnally–Hilgemann Racing	Chevrolet	4
8	62	John Hunter Nemechek (i)	Halmar Friesen Racing	Toyota	0
9	75	Corey LaJoie (i)	Henderson Motorsports	Chevrolet	0
10	99	Ben Rhodes	ThorSport Racing	Ford	1

=== Final stage results ===
Stage Three Laps: 62

Fin	St	#	Driver	Team	Make	Laps	Led	Status	Pts
1	10	38	Chandler Smith	Front Row Motorsports	Ford	102	8	Running	65
2	9	17	Gio Ruggiero	Tricon Garage	Toyota	102	0	Running	35
3	11	91	Christian Eckes	McAnally–Hilgemann Racing	Chevrolet	102	1	Running	46
4	1	88	Ty Majeski	ThorSport Racing	Ford	102	5	Running	45
5	19	62	John Hunter Nemechek (i)	Halmar Friesen Racing	Toyota	102	10	Running	0
6	30	45	Ricky Stenhouse Jr. (i)	Niece Motorsports	Chevrolet	102	0	Running	0
7	22	12	Brenden Queen (R)	Kaulig Racing	Ram	102	0	Running	32
8	7	11	Kaden Honeycutt	Tricon Garage	Toyota	102	1	Running	34
9	6	18	Tyler Ankrum	McAnally–Hilgemann Racing	Chevrolet	102	0	Running	28
10	24	52	Stewart Friesen	Halmar Friesen Racing	Toyota	102	0	Running	27
11	25	5	Nick Leitz	Tricon Garage	Toyota	102	3	Running	31
12	27	99	Ben Rhodes	ThorSport Racing	Ford	102	0	Running	26
13	28	44	Andrés Pérez de Lara	Niece Motorsports	Chevrolet	102	0	Running	24
14	23	13	Cole Butcher (R)	ThorSport Racing	Ford	102	0	Running	23
15	13	42	Travis Pastrana	Niece Motorsports	Chevrolet	102	1	Running	22
16	33	33	Frankie Muniz	Team Reaume	Ford	102	0	Running	21
17	31	10	Daniel Dye	Kaulig Racing	Ram	102	0	Running	20
18	17	95	Clay Greenfield	GK Racing	Chevrolet	102	0	Running	19
19	37	14	Mini Tyrrell (R)	Kaulig Racing	Ram	102	0	Running	18
20	29	22	Josh Reaume	Team Reaume	Ford	102	0	Running	17
21	34	76	Spencer Boyd	Freedom Racing Enterprises	Chevrolet	102	0	Running	16
22	16	16	Justin Haley	Kaulig Racing	Ram	102	20	Running	15
23	3	15	Tanner Gray	Tricon Garage	Toyota	102	11	Running	23
24	2	7	Michael McDowell (i)	Spire Motorsports	Chevrolet	101	20	Running	0
25	26	81	Kris Wright	McAnally–Hilgemann Racing	Chevrolet	101	0	Running	12
26	32	19	Daniel Hemric	McAnally–Hilgemann Racing	Chevrolet	101	0	Running	12
27	20	26	Dawson Sutton	Rackley W.A.R.	Chevrolet	101	0	Running	10
28	14	1	Taylor Gray (i)	Tricon Garage	Toyota	101	0	Running	0
29	5	9	Grant Enfinger	CR7 Motorsports	Chevrolet	100	0	Running	9
30	21	97	Jason Kitzmiller	CR7 Motorsports	Chevrolet	100	0	Running	7
31	35	34	Layne Riggs	Front Row Motorsports	Ford	98	2	Running	15
32	8	98	Jake Garcia	ThorSport Racing	Ford	98	0	Running	5
33	36	2	Jason White	Team Reaume	Ford	98	0	Running	4
34	18	75	Corey LaJoie (i)	Henderson Motorsports	Chevrolet	92	0	Engine	0
35	4	77	Carson Hocevar (i)	Spire Motorsports	Chevrolet	88	20	Suspension	0
36	15	25	Tony Stewart	Kaulig Racing	Ram	39	0	Accident	1
37	12	4	Garrett Mitchell	Niece Motorsports	Chevrolet	5	0	Accident	1
Official race results

=== Race statistics ===
- Lead changes: 32 among 12 different drivers
- Cautions/Laps: 6 for 31 laps
- Red flags: 0
- Time of race: 2 hours, 6 minutes and 0 seconds
- Average speed: 121.429 miles per hour (195.421 km/h)

== Standings after the race ==
Drivers' Championship standings

Pos	Driver	Points
1	Chandler Smith	65
2	Christian Eckes	46 (–19)
3	Ty Majeski	45 (–20)
4	Gio Ruggiero	35 (–30)
5	Kaden Honeycutt	34 (–31)
6	Brenden Queen	32 (–33)
7	Nick Leitz	31 (–34)
8	Tyler Ankrum	28 (–37)
9	Stewart Friesen	27 (–38)
10	Ben Rhodes	26 (–39)
Official driver's standings

Manufacturers' Championship standings

Pos	Manufacturer	Points
1	Ford	40
2	Toyota	35 (–5)
3	Chevrolet	34 (–6)
4	Ram	30 (–10)

- Note: Only the first 10 positions are included for the driver standings.

Previous race: 2025 NASCAR Craftsman Truck Series Championship Race	NASCAR Craftsman Truck Series; 2026 season	Next race: 2026 Fr8 208
