= Cleetus McFarland =

American YouTuber and racing driver (born 1995)

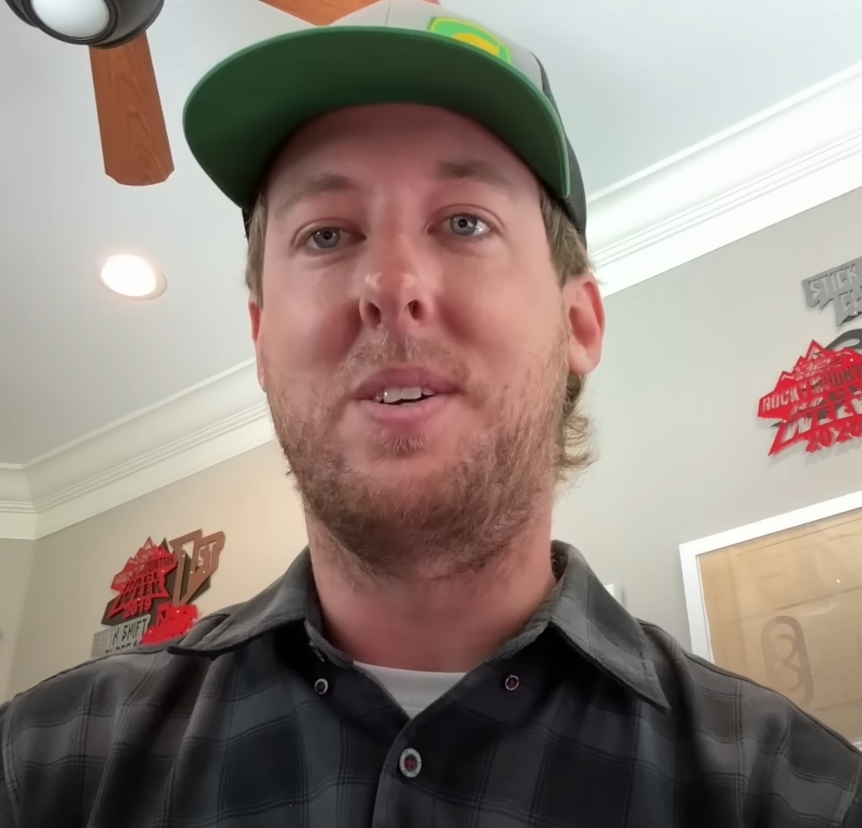
- Mitchell in 2024
- Born: Garrett Mitchell; April 5, 1995 (age 31); Omaha, Nebraska, U.S.
- Achievements: 2025, 2026 2.4 Hours of LeMullets Winner; 2023 Freedom 500 Winner

NASCAR O'Reilly Auto Parts Series career
- 2 races run over 1 year
- Car no., team: No. 33 (Richard Childress Racing)
- 2026 position: 63rd
- Best finish: 63rd (2026)
- First race: 2026 North Carolina Education Lottery 250 (Rockingham)
- Last race: 2026 Sports Illustrated Resorts 250 (Nashville)
Wins	Top tens	Poles
0	0	0

NASCAR FedEx Freight Truck Series career
- 3 races run over 1 year
- 2026 position: 116th
- Best finish: 116th (2026)
- First race: 2026 Fresh From Florida 250 (Daytona)
- Last race: 2026 Love's RV Stop 225 (Talladega)
Wins	Top tens	Poles
0	0	0

ARCA Menards Series career
- 8 races run over 2 years
- ARCA no., team: No. 33 (Richard Childress Racing)
- Best finish: 37th (2026)
- First race: 2025 Ride the 'Dente 200 (Daytona)
- Last race: 2026 Henry Ford Health 200 (Michigan)
Wins	Top tens	Poles
0	3	1

ARCA Menards Series East career
- 2 races run over 2 years
- ARCA East no., team: No. 33 (Richard Childress Racing)
- Best finish: 46th (2026)
- First race: 2025 Bush's Beans 200 (Bristol)
- Last race: 2026 Rockingham ARCA Menards Series East 125 (Rockingham)
Wins	Top tens	Poles
0	1	0

ARCA Menards Series West career
- ARCA West no., team: No. 33 (Richard Childress Racing)

YouTube information
- Channel: Cleetus McFarland
- Years active: 2009–present
- Subscribers: 4.75 million
- Views: 2.20 billion
- Statistics up to date as of November 13, 2026.

Garrett Mitchell (born April 5, 1995), known professionally as Cleetus McFarland, is an American YouTuber and professional stock car racing driver. As of November 2026, he has over 4.8 million subscribers. He currently competes part-time in the NASCAR O'Reilly Auto Parts Series, driving the No. 33 Chevrolet Camaro SS for Richard Childress Racing, full-time in the ARCA Menards Series, driving the No. 33 Chevrolet SS for RCR, part-time in Asphalt Pro Late Model competition, driving the No. 33 Chevrolet Camaro for McFarland Racing, and part-time in Dirt Super Late Model competition, driving the No. 13 for Race DRT.

== YouTube career ==
On January 28, 2009, Mitchell started his YouTube channel, around the same time he became the social media manager for car media company 1320Video. He eventually left 1320Video to pursue a full-time career with his own YouTube channel.

In 2015, Mitchell adopted the moniker "Cleetus McFarland" after a character Kyle Loftis created that went viral at the annual Rocky Mountain Race Week with Tom Bailey. The name Cleetus was quickly adopted by his YouTube channel and is now how he is most referred to, rarely hearing his real name used outside of close friends and family.

Mitchell would then go on to create a bodyless Chevrolet Corvette C5 with an exo-cage named "Leroy". Leroy built a major fan following online, winning numerous trophies and setting both personal and world records. After finding career success as a YouTube content creator and racing enthusiast, he built a purpose-built race car from a Chevrolet El Camino known as "Mullet".

=== Freedom Factory ===
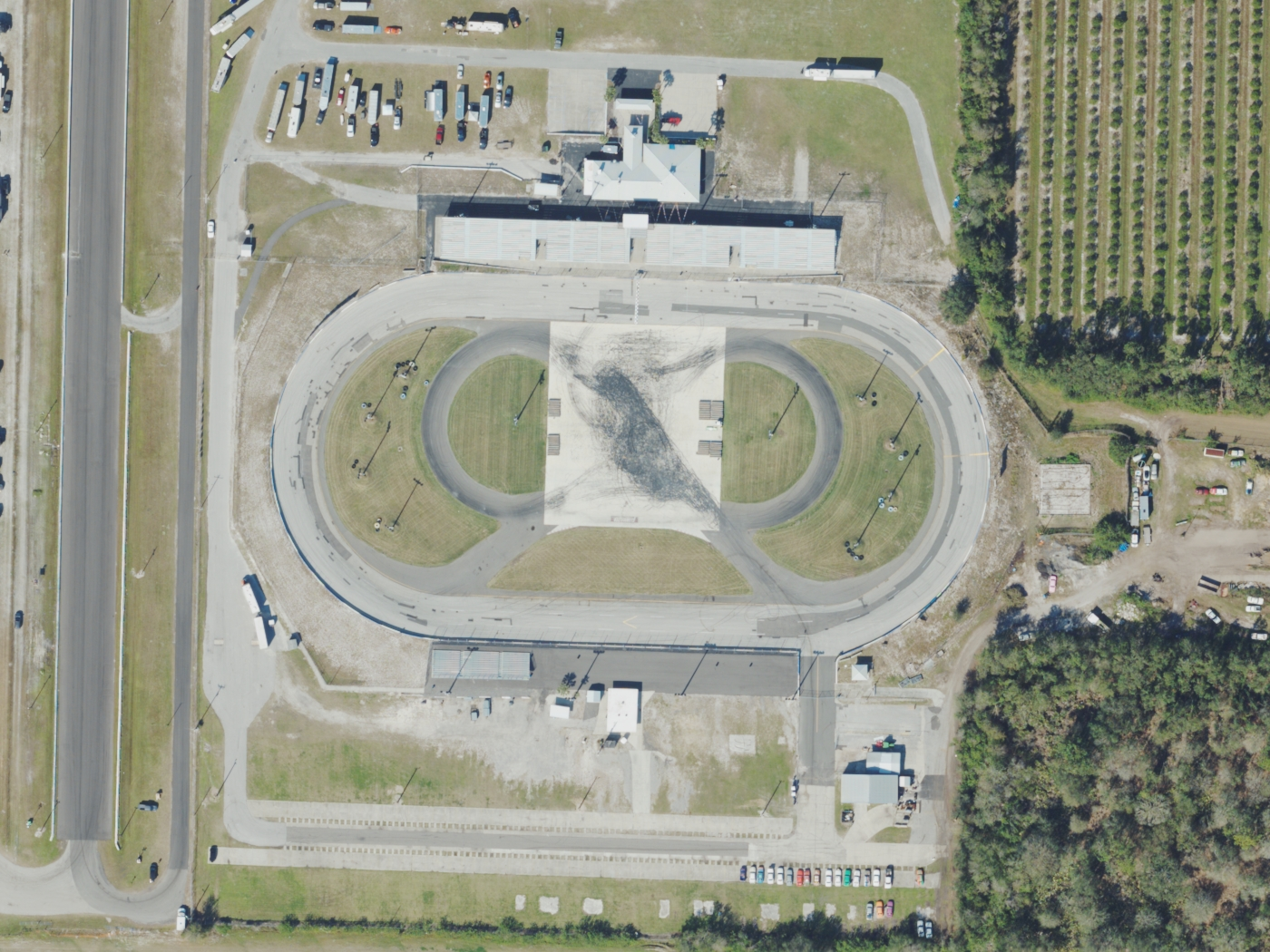
2023 aerial view of Freedom Factory (formerly Desoto Speedway, 1971–2020). The oval and figure 8 racing track is off State Road 64, adjacent to the Bradenton Motorsports Park dragstrip.

In January 2020, Mitchell bought the abandoned Desoto Speedway, a 3/8 mi Asphalt Oval & Figure 8 Track in Manatee County, Florida, and later renamed the track to Freedom Factory.

== Racing career ==
=== Stadium Super Trucks ===
On April 6, 2022, it was announced on The Checkered Flag that Mitchell would make his debut in the Stadium Super Trucks at Long Beach, California, racing the No. 1776 truck as Cleetus McFarland. In the weekend's second of two races, he was leading on the final lap, poised to take the victory until the last jump, when he spun out after his truck hit the ground, leaving Robby Gordon to claim the win.

Another attempt came at the Music City Grand Prix in August, but he was involved in crashes in both races; the second race saw him get squeezed into the wall while racing Gavin Harlien and Robert Stout, causing him to flip onto his roof.

Mitchell invited the trucks to his Bristol 1000 at Bristol Motor Speedway a month later, where he finished third in Race 2.

=== Drag racing ===
On November 6, 2022, Mitchell & his crew won first place after eliminating Carlos Olivo in the McLeod Racing Warriors VS Tres Cuarto category of the 26th Annual Haltech World Cup Finals Import & Domestic Drag Races in the four-day event. His Chevrolet El Camino (Mullet) managed an elapsed time of 6.474 seconds at a top speed of 222.95 mph on the final round of the elimination race.

Returning to the event in 2023, Mitchell won in the Grannas Racing Stick Shift class driving his body-less Chevrolet Corvette "Leroy" with time of 7.325 and speed of 203.95 mph in the finals.

=== ARCA Menards Series ===
==== 2025 ====
In 2025, it was revealed that Mitchell would participate in the pre-season test for the ARCA Menards Series at Daytona International Speedway, driving the No. 30 Ford for Rette Jones Racing as Garrett Mitchell. On January 15, it was announced on Facebook that Mitchell would drive in the season opener at Daytona for RJR also as Garrett Mitchell. He finished in 30th after being involved in a multi-car crash over a quarter of the way through the race. Mitchell would continue to announce that he would return with the team at Talladega, Charlotte, and the ARCA Menards Series East combination race at Bristol.

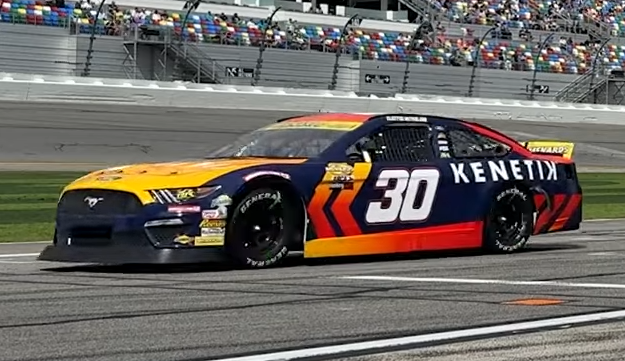
McFarland's No. 30 car at Daytona International Speedway in 2025

==== 2026 ====
After the race at Bristol, it was confirmed that Mitchell will return to ARCA in 2026 on a partial schedule, this time as Cleetus McFarland. He ran the season opener again at Daytona and finished 11th. He competed in the East Series race at Rockingham alongside his friend George Siciliano (referred to as "LS George" or "Squirrel McNutt"), where he would finish in fourth place. They both ran at Kansas, where McFarland finished 20th. They also ran at Talladega, where McFarland finished second.

==== 2027 ====
In October of 2026, it was revealed that McFarland will drive full-time in the main ARCA series in 2027, driving the No. 33 Chevrolet for Richard Childress Racing.

=== NASCAR ===
==== Craftsman Truck Series ====
===== 2026 =====
On February 4, 2026, it was announced that McFarland would begin testing at Rockingham Speedway to attempt to get approval to make his NASCAR Craftsman Truck Series debut in the No. 4 for Niece Motorsports. He started 12th at Daytona but got loose off turn 4 on lap 6 and hit the inside wall, finishing 37th.

==== O'Reilly Auto Parts Series ====
===== 2026 =====
On March 4, 2026, it was announced that McFarland would drive three races in the No. 33 for Richard Childress Racing starting at Rockingham in April. At Rockingham, he finished 32nd. McFarland planned to run the Spring Talladega race, but was not approved due to lack of experience in NASCAR. He ran at Nashville, finishing 35th.

== Motorsports career results ==
=== Stock car career summary ===
Season	Series	Team	Races	Wins	Top 5	Top 10	Points	Position
2025	ARCA Menards Series East	Rette Jones Racing	1	0	0	0	27	61st
2025	ARCA Menards Series	Rette Jones Racing	4	0	0	2	110	40th
2026	ASA STARS National Tour	Rette Jones Racing	1	0	0	0		
2026	ARCA Menards Series East	Rette Jones Racing	1	0	1	1	40	46th
2026	ARCA Menards Series	Rette Jones Racing	4	0	1	1	132	37th
2026	NASCAR Craftsman Truck Series	Niece Motorsports	3	0	0	0	0	NC†
2026	NASCAR O'Reilly Auto Parts Series	Richard Childress Racing	2	0	0	0	7	63rd

^{†} As McFarland was a guest driver, he was ineligible for championship points.

=== NASCAR ===
(key) (Bold – Pole position awarded by qualifying time. Italics – Pole position earned by points standings or practice time. * – Most laps led.)

==== O'Reilly Auto Parts Series ====
NASCAR O'Reilly Auto Parts Series results
Year	Team	No.	Make	1	2	3	4	5	6	7	8	9	10	11	12	13	14	15	16	17	18	19	20	21	22	23	24	25	26	27	28	29	30	31	32	33	NOAPSC	Pts	Ref
2026	Richard Childress Racing	33	Chevy	DAY	ATL	COA	PHO	LVS	DAR	MAR	CAR; 32	BRI	KAN	TAL	TEX	GLN	DOV	CLT	NSH; 35	POC	COR	SON	CHI	ATL	IND	IOW	DAY	DAR	GTW	BRI	LVS	CLT	PHO	TAL	MAR	HOM	63rd	7	

==== Craftsman Truck Series ====
NASCAR Craftsman Truck Series results
Year	Team	No.	Make	1	2	3	4	5	6	7	8	9	10	11	12	13	14	15	16	17	18	19	20	21	22	23	24	25	NCTC	Pts	Ref
2026	Niece Motorsports	4	Chevy	DAY; 37	ATL	STP	DAR	CAR	BRI	TEX	GLN	DOV	CLT	NSH	MCH; 25	COR	LRP	NWS	IRP	RCH	NHA	BRI	KAN	CLT	PHO	TAL; 36	MAR	HOM	116th	0^{1}	

^{*} Season still in progress
^{1} Ineligible for series points

=== ARCA Menards Series ===
(key) (Bold – Pole position awarded by qualifying time. Italics – Pole position earned by points standings or practice time. * – Most laps led.)

ARCA Menards Series results
Year	Team	No.	Make	1	2	3	4	5	6	7	8	9	10	11	12	13	14	15	16	17	18	19	20	AMSC	Pts	Ref
2025	Rette Jones Racing	30	Ford	DAY; 30	PHO	TAL; 10	KAN	CLT; 9	MCH	BLN	ELK	LRP	DOV	IRP	IOW	GLN	ISF	MAD	DSF	BRI; 17	SLM	KAN	TOL	40th	110	
2026	Rette Jones Racing	30	Ford	DAY; 11	PHO	KAN; 20	TAL; 2	GLN	TOL	**MCH**; 14	POC	BER	ELK	CHI	LRP	IRP	IOW	ISF	MAD	DSF	SLM	BRI	KAN	37th	132	

==== ARCA Menards Series East ====
ARCA Menards Series East results
Year	Team	No.	Make	1	2	3	4	5	6	7	8	AMSEC	Pts	Ref
2025	Rette Jones Racing	30	Ford	FIF	CAR	NSV	FRS	DOV	IRP	IOW	BRI; 17	61st	27	
2026	Rette Jones Racing	30	Ford	HCY	CAR; 4	NSV	TOL	IRP	FRS	IOW	BRI	46th	40	

=== ASA STARS National Tour ===
(key) (Bold – Pole position awarded by qualifying time. Italics – Pole position earned by points standings or practice time. * – Most laps led. ** – All laps led.)

ASA STARS National Tour results
Year	Team	No.	Make	1	2	3	4	5	6	7	8	9	10	11	ASNTC	Pts	Ref
2026	Rette Jones Racing	33	Chevy	NSM	FIF	HCY	SLG	MAD	NPS	OWO	TRI	WIN	NSV	NSM; 14	-*	-*	

=== Stadium Super Trucks ===
(key) (Bold – Pole position. Italics – Fastest qualifier. * – Most laps led.)

Stadium Super Trucks results
Year	1	2	3	4	5	6	7	8	SSTC	Pts	Ref
2022	LBH; 10	LBH; 9*	MOH	MOH	NSH; 10	**NSH**; 9*	BRI; 12	BRI; 3*	9th	84	

^{*} Season in progress.

Achievements
Preceded by Keith McGee and Derek Bieri	2.4 Hours of LeMullets Winner; 2025, 2026	Succeeded by Incumbent
