= TX2K =

Annual car racing event

- Frequency: Annual
- Venue: Houston Raceway Park (2000–2023); Texas Motorplex (2024–present)
- Locations: Ennis, Texas, United States
- Coordinates: 32.3286°N 96.7174°W
- Inaugurated: 2000
- Founder: Peter Blach
- Attendance: 30,000+
- Sponsor: Summit Racing Equipment
- Website: https://tx2k.com/

TX2K is a drag racing event that has been held annually in Texas since 2000.

Established in the early 2000s, the event is best known for hosting street-car enthusiasts, professional tuners, and manufacturers for a multi-day program centered on competitive racing and car culture. It has been nicknamed "The Super Bowl of Street Car Racing" by the press.

Each iteration of the event is named by year, for example 2020's event was named TX2K20.

== History ==
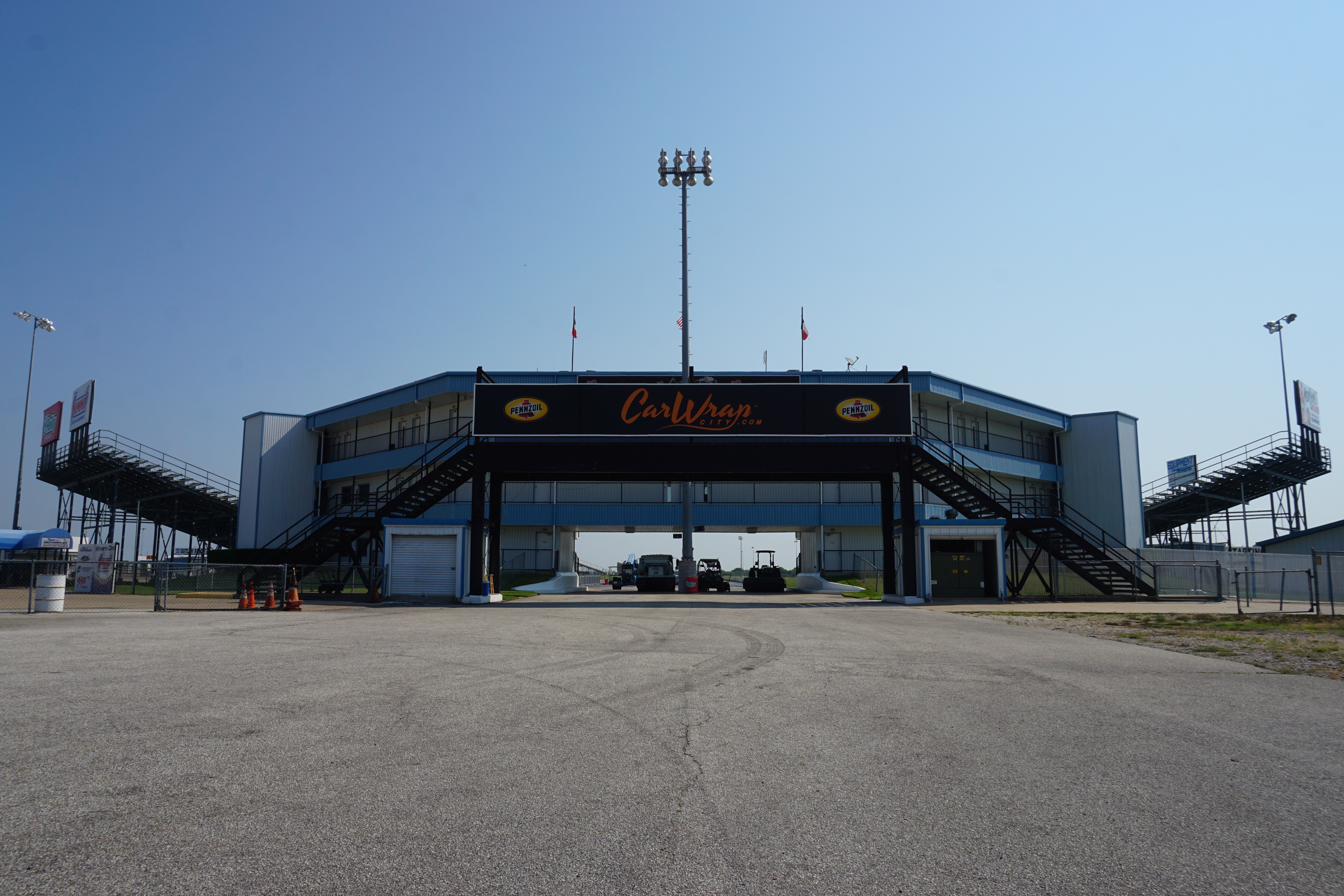
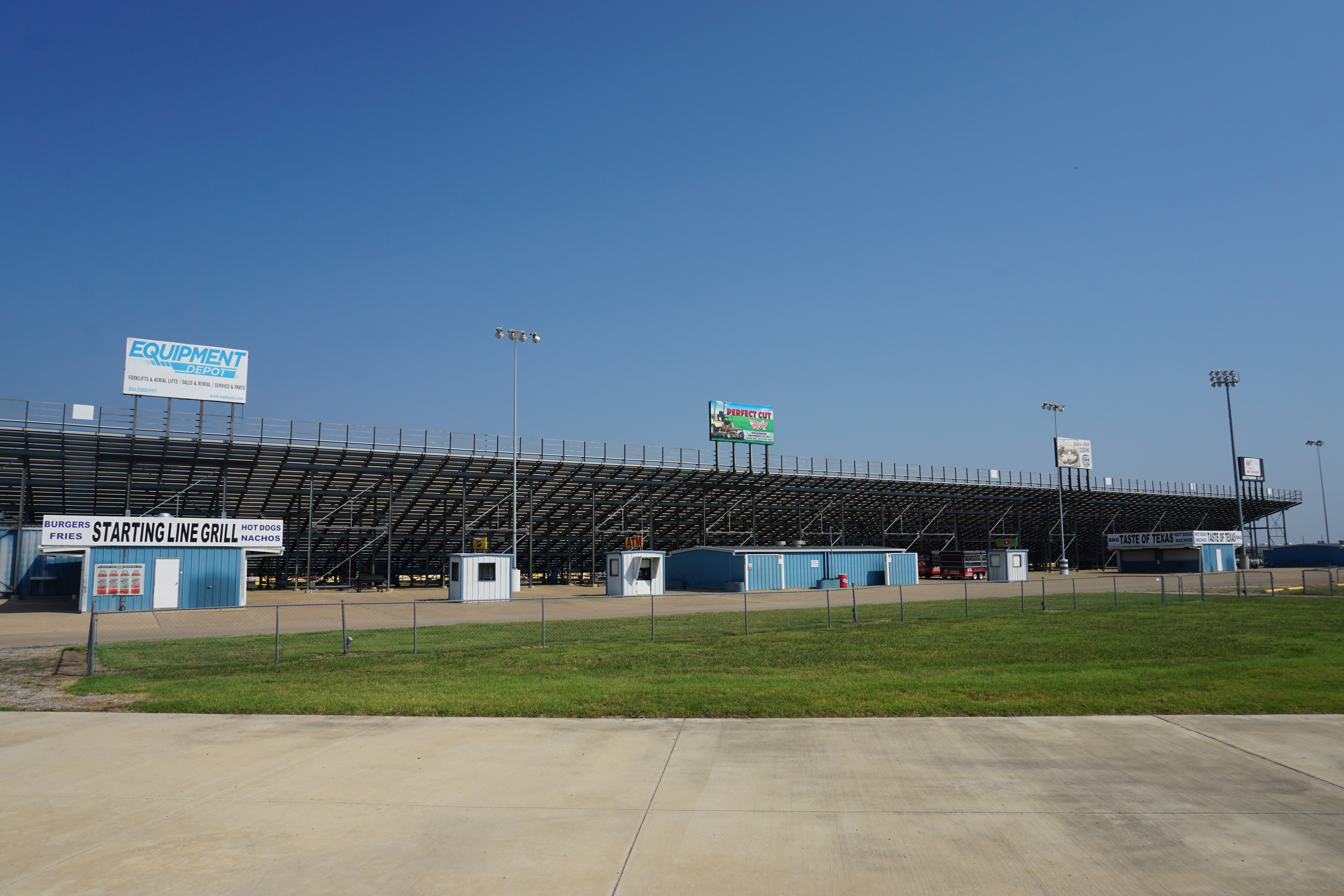
Texas Motorplex, the venue of TX2K since 2024

The event was originally founded by Peter Blach in 2000 as an event for Toyota Supra owners to have an alternative to illegal street racing, with the first year hosting 40 Supras. In the following years, the event expanded to include other street cars such as modified muscle cars and supercars, and has grown to attract over 30,000 attendees annually. The event was initially held at Houston Raceway Park, formerly known as Royal Purple Raceway, from 2000 until the venue's closure in 2023, whereafter the event has been held at Texas Motorplex.

The event has annually been the largest Toyota Supra event and Nissan GT-R event in the United States.

The main attraction of TX2K is heads-up drag racing and roll-racing competition. Alongside on-track races, the event features dyno testing, car shows, vendor exhibitions, and community meet-ups, making it both a motorsports competition and a trade-show-style showcase for aftermarket performance parts and builds.

Over time, TX2K has gained a reputation for hosting some of the faster street-legal cars in North America and for serving as a platform for record attempts, product demonstrations, and matchups.

The event is centered around street cars, but more recent years of the event have expanded to include the unregulated "exhibition class" cars.

== Street racing ==
Although the event was created to offer a safe and legal alternative to illegal street racing, the draw of the event bringing enthusiasts and high-horsepower builds to one location has resulted in street racing coinciding with the event weekend in the host city. This has led to increased police presence, hundreds of arrests, and thousands of citations during the event weekend. Similarly, the street racing has also gained social media virality, with grudge match races of well-known builds and street racing exceeding 200 miles per hour (320 km/h) gaining millions of views online. As a result, the unsanctioned street racing has gained notoriety and become equally as famous as the official event.
